This is a partial list of unnumbered minor planets for principal provisional designations assigned between 1 August and 15 September 2001. , a total of 614 bodies remain unnumbered for this period. Objects for this year are listed on the following pages: A–E · Fi · Fii · G–O · P–R · S · T · U · V–W and X–Y. Also see previous and next year.

P 

|- id="2001 PC" bgcolor=#d6d6d6
| 0 || 2001 PC || MBA-O || 16.30 || 3.1 km || multiple || 2001–2021 || 03 Dec 2021 || 413 || align=left | Disc.: NEAT || 
|- id="2001 PJ" bgcolor=#FFC2E0
| 6 || 2001 PJ || AMO || 21.3 || data-sort-value="0.20" | 200 m || single || 57 days || 30 Sep 2001 || 42 || align=left | Disc.: AMOS || 
|- id="2001 PX3" bgcolor=#E9E9E9
| 0 ||  || MBA-M || 16.84 || 1.3 km || multiple || 1997–2021 || 03 May 2021 || 189 || align=left | Disc.: NEAT || 
|- id="2001 PA4" bgcolor=#FA8072
| 1 ||  || MCA || 17.9 || data-sort-value="0.78" | 780 m || multiple || 2001–2018 || 20 Dec 2018 || 72 || align=left | Disc.: NEAT || 
|- id="2001 PS4" bgcolor=#fefefe
| 0 ||  || MBA-I || 16.99 || 1.2 km || multiple || 2001–2022 || 25 Jan 2022 || 394 || align=left | Disc.: AMOS || 
|- id="2001 PK5" bgcolor=#d6d6d6
| 0 ||  || MBA-O || 16.36 || 3.0 km || multiple || 2001–2021 || 14 Apr 2021 || 91 || align=left | Disc.: NEAT || 
|- id="2001 PE8" bgcolor=#E9E9E9
| 0 ||  || MBA-M || 16.6 || 1.4 km || multiple || 2001–2020 || 11 May 2020 || 97 || align=left | Disc.: NEAT || 
|- id="2001 PH9" bgcolor=#FFC2E0
| 1 ||  || AMO || 21.3 || data-sort-value="0.20" | 200 m || multiple || 2001–2019 || 04 Nov 2019 || 74 || align=left | Disc.: NEAT || 
|- id="2001 PS9" bgcolor=#FA8072
| 1 ||  || MCA || 17.97 || data-sort-value="0.76" | 760 m || multiple || 2001–2021 || 05 Jun 2021 || 46 || align=left | Disc.: NEAT || 
|- id="2001 PU9" bgcolor=#FFC2E0
| 1 ||  || AMO || 19.43 || data-sort-value="0.46" | 460 m || multiple || 2001–2021 || 28 May 2021 || 74 || align=left | Disc.: AMOS || 
|- id="2001 PO10" bgcolor=#E9E9E9
| 0 ||  || MBA-M || 17.41 || 1.4 km || multiple || 2001–2021 || 09 Apr 2021 || 186 || align=left | Disc.: AMOSAlt.: 2010 VV89 || 
|- id="2001 PO13" bgcolor=#FA8072
| 0 ||  || MCA || 19.01 || data-sort-value="0.47" | 470 m || multiple || 2001–2021 || 01 Nov 2021 || 180 || align=left | Disc.: AMOS || 
|- id="2001 PU13" bgcolor=#FA8072
| 1 ||  || MCA || 18.0 || data-sort-value="0.75" | 750 m || multiple || 2001–2020 || 22 Jan 2020 || 88 || align=left | Disc.: NEATAlt.: 2015 XU261 || 
|- id="2001 PF14" bgcolor=#FFC2E0
| 2 ||  || AMO || 19.5 || data-sort-value="0.45" | 450 m || multiple || 2001–2007 || 25 Apr 2007 || 77 || align=left | Disc.: NEAT || 
|- id="2001 PG14" bgcolor=#FFC2E0
| 7 ||  || APO || 22.5 || data-sort-value="0.11" | 110 m || single || 30 days || 13 Sep 2001 || 68 || align=left | Disc.: NEAT || 
|- id="2001 PB15" bgcolor=#FA8072
| 0 ||  || HUN || 18.79 || data-sort-value="0.52" | 520 m || multiple || 2001–2021 || 17 Apr 2021 || 51 || align=left | Disc.: NEATAlt.: 2013 BQ70 || 
|- id="2001 PC15" bgcolor=#E9E9E9
| 2 ||  || MBA-M || 18.1 || 1.0 km || multiple || 2001–2019 || 03 Jan 2019 || 108 || align=left | Disc.: AMOS || 
|- id="2001 PR15" bgcolor=#fefefe
| 0 ||  || MBA-I || 17.54 || data-sort-value="0.92" | 920 m || multiple || 2001–2021 || 10 May 2021 || 138 || align=left | Disc.: NEATAlt.: 2005 VK46, 2014 HQ130, 2015 VV131 || 
|- id="2001 PN16" bgcolor=#E9E9E9
| 0 ||  || MBA-M || 17.00 || 1.7 km || multiple || 2001–2021 || 03 May 2021 || 179 || align=left | Disc.: NEAT || 
|- id="2001 PX16" bgcolor=#d6d6d6
| 0 ||  || MBA-O || 16.1 || 3.4 km || multiple || 2001–2019 || 20 Dec 2019 || 105 || align=left | Disc.: NEATAlt.: 2011 GA24 || 
|- id="2001 PA17" bgcolor=#FA8072
| 0 ||  || MCA || 17.87 || data-sort-value="0.79" | 790 m || multiple || 2001–2021 || 05 Jan 2021 || 181 || align=left | Disc.: NEATAlt.: 2005 UJ30 || 
|- id="2001 PH17" bgcolor=#fefefe
| 1 ||  || MBA-I || 19.0 || data-sort-value="0.47" | 470 m || multiple || 2001–2020 || 07 Dec 2020 || 100 || align=left | Disc.: NEATAlt.: 2013 HU89 || 
|- id="2001 PG23" bgcolor=#E9E9E9
| 0 ||  || MBA-M || 16.47 || 2.1 km || multiple || 2001–2021 || 10 Apr 2021 || 169 || align=left | Disc.: NEAT || 
|- id="2001 PN23" bgcolor=#fefefe
| 0 ||  || MBA-I || 17.7 || data-sort-value="0.86" | 860 m || multiple || 2001–2021 || 18 Jan 2021 || 192 || align=left | Disc.: AMOSAlt.: 2012 SM11 || 
|- id="2001 PL24" bgcolor=#E9E9E9
| 1 ||  || MBA-M || 17.5 || 1.3 km || multiple || 2001–2019 || 24 Dec 2019 || 41 || align=left | Disc.: AMOSAlt.: 2019 TR28 || 
|- id="2001 PY27" bgcolor=#E9E9E9
| 0 ||  || MBA-M || 16.9 || 1.8 km || multiple || 2001–2020 || 11 Dec 2020 || 70 || align=left | Disc.: AMOSAlt.: 2015 XV85 || 
|- id="2001 PH29" bgcolor=#FA8072
| 1 ||  || MCA || 18.36 || data-sort-value="0.82" | 640 m || multiple || 2001-2022 || 19 Nov 2022 || 96 || align=left | Disc.: AMOSAlt.: 2022 QR105 || 
|- id="2001 PJ29" bgcolor=#FFC2E0
| 4 ||  || APO || 23.0 || data-sort-value="0.089" | 89 m || single || 15 days || 30 Aug 2001 || 67 || align=left | Disc.: AMOS || 
|- id="2001 PX30" bgcolor=#E9E9E9
| 3 ||  || MBA-M || 17.8 || data-sort-value="0.90" | 820 m || multiple || 2001-2021 || 11 Jun 2021 || 18 || align=left | Disc.: NEAT || 
|- id="2001 PB31" bgcolor=#fefefe
| 0 ||  || MBA-I || 18.26 || data-sort-value="0.66" | 660 m || multiple || 2001–2021 || 09 Apr 2021 || 78 || align=left | Disc.: NEAT || 
|- id="2001 PM31" bgcolor=#E9E9E9
| 0 ||  || MBA-M || 17.07 || 1.1 km || multiple || 1993–2021 || 07 Jul 2021 || 149 || align=left | Disc.: NEAT || 
|- id="2001 PA32" bgcolor=#E9E9E9
| 0 ||  || MBA-M || 17.25 || 1.1 km || multiple || 2001–2021 || 08 May 2021 || 115 || align=left | Disc.: NEATAlt.: 2017 HB12 || 
|- id="2001 PM34" bgcolor=#E9E9E9
| 0 ||  || MBA-M || 17.4 || 1.4 km || multiple || 2001–2018 || 11 Jul 2018 || 114 || align=left | Disc.: NEAT || 
|- id="2001 PY35" bgcolor=#d6d6d6
| – ||  || MBA-O || 17.4 || 1.8 km || single || 56 days || 06 Oct 2001 || 15 || align=left | Disc.: NEAT || 
|- id="2001 PE36" bgcolor=#E9E9E9
| 0 ||  || MBA-M || 16.41 || 2.2 km || multiple || 2001–2021 || 15 May 2021 || 280 || align=left | Disc.: NEAT || 
|- id="2001 PR36" bgcolor=#E9E9E9
| 1 ||  || MBA-M || 17.4 || 1.4 km || multiple || 1997–2014 || 15 Dec 2014 || 87 || align=left | Disc.: NEATAlt.: 2010 VV197 || 
|- id="2001 PT42" bgcolor=#E9E9E9
| 0 ||  || MBA-M || 16.5 || 2.8 km || multiple || 2001–2020 || 19 Dec 2020 || 121 || align=left | Disc.: NEATAlt.: 2015 UJ76 || 
|- id="2001 PE43" bgcolor=#E9E9E9
| 0 ||  || MBA-M || 17.4 || 1.4 km || multiple || 2001–2018 || 08 Aug 2018 || 104 || align=left | Disc.: AMOS || 
|- id="2001 PY43" bgcolor=#FA8072
| 0 ||  || MCA || 18.7 || data-sort-value="0.54" | 540 m || multiple || 2001–2018 || 14 Jun 2018 || 64 || align=left | Disc.: AMOS || 
|- id="2001 PK44" bgcolor=#fefefe
| 0 ||  || MBA-I || 16.9 || 1.2 km || multiple || 2000–2021 || 04 Jan 2021 || 150 || align=left | Disc.: AMOSAlt.: 2009 VO90, 2015 FG340 || 
|- id="2001 PK47" bgcolor=#C2E0FF
| 4 ||  || TNO || 7.32 || 176 km || multiple || 2001–2020 || 09 Dec 2020 || 34 || align=left | Disc.: Mauna Kea Obs.LoUTNOs, cubewano (hot) || 
|- id="2001 PA48" bgcolor=#FA8072
| 0 ||  || MCA || 18.3 || data-sort-value="0.65" | 650 m || multiple || 2001–2019 || 25 Nov 2019 || 121 || align=left | Disc.: NEATAlt.: 2017 BS91 || 
|- id="2001 PK48" bgcolor=#d6d6d6
| 0 ||  || MBA-O || 15.4 || 4.6 km || multiple || 1999–2021 || 18 Jan 2021 || 193 || align=left | Disc.: AMOSAlt.: 2011 GU36, 2014 YM34, 2016 ER89 || 
|- id="2001 PP49" bgcolor=#d6d6d6
| 0 ||  || MBA-O || 16.3 || 3.1 km || multiple || 2001–2020 || 22 Dec 2020 || 56 || align=left | Disc.: NEAT || 
|- id="2001 PR51" bgcolor=#fefefe
| 0 ||  || MBA-I || 17.32 || 1.0 km || multiple || 2001–2022 || 24 Jan 2022 || 140 || align=left | Disc.: AMOSAlt.: 2010 CF208 || 
|- id="2001 PX51" bgcolor=#d6d6d6
| 2 ||  || MBA-O || 17.1 || 2.1 km || multiple || 2001–2017 || 23 Oct 2017 || 35 || align=left | Disc.: AMOSAlt.: 2017 NN3 || 
|- id="2001 PF52" bgcolor=#fefefe
| 0 ||  || MBA-I || 17.52 || data-sort-value="0.93" | 930 m || multiple || 2001–2021 || 10 Jun 2021 || 135 || align=left | Disc.: AMOSAlt.: 2008 QS43 || 
|- id="2001 PQ53" bgcolor=#E9E9E9
| 1 ||  || MBA-M || 17.5 || 1.3 km || multiple || 2001–2018 || 17 Aug 2018 || 55 || align=left | Disc.: NEAT || 
|- id="2001 PA55" bgcolor=#E9E9E9
| 1 ||  || MBA-M || 17.6 || data-sort-value="0.90" | 900 m || multiple || 2001–2021 || 11 Jun 2021 || 38 || align=left | Disc.: AMOSAlt.: 2021 GO113 || 
|- id="2001 PN55" bgcolor=#fefefe
| 0 ||  || MBA-I || 17.8 || data-sort-value="0.82" | 820 m || multiple || 2001–2019 || 21 Nov 2019 || 172 || align=left | Disc.: AMOSAlt.: 2012 RJ20 || 
|- id="2001 PO55" bgcolor=#d6d6d6
| 0 ||  || MBA-O || 16.59 || 2.7 km || multiple || 2001–2021 || 12 May 2021 || 50 || align=left | Disc.: AMOSAlt.: 2012 PX11 || 
|- id="2001 PS56" bgcolor=#fefefe
| 1 ||  || MBA-I || 17.9 || data-sort-value="0.78" | 780 m || multiple || 2001–2019 || 05 Nov 2019 || 68 || align=left | Disc.: AMOS || 
|- id="2001 PL57" bgcolor=#E9E9E9
| 0 ||  || MBA-M || 16.9 || 1.8 km || multiple || 2001–2020 || 23 Jan 2020 || 142 || align=left | Disc.: AMOS || 
|- id="2001 PJ60" bgcolor=#E9E9E9
| 1 ||  || MBA-M || 17.2 || 1.5 km || multiple || 2001–2020 || 25 Jan 2020 || 157 || align=left | Disc.: AMOSAlt.: 2010 LM53 || 
|- id="2001 PK60" bgcolor=#FA8072
| 0 ||  || MCA || 18.01 || data-sort-value="0.74" | 740 m || multiple || 2001–2020 || 31 Jan 2020 || 173 || align=left | Disc.: AMOSAlt.: 2006 AY1 || 
|- id="2001 PT60" bgcolor=#E9E9E9
| 0 ||  || MBA-M || 16.5 || 2.1 km || multiple || 2001–2020 || 23 Jan 2020 || 142 || align=left | Disc.: AMOSAlt.: 2014 QO192 || 
|- id="2001 PJ61" bgcolor=#E9E9E9
| 0 ||  || MBA-M || 16.67 || 1.4 km || multiple || 2001–2021 || 09 Jul 2021 || 317 || align=left | Disc.: AMOSAlt.: 2011 AD16 || 
|- id="2001 PJ65" bgcolor=#FA8072
| 2 ||  || MCA || 18.8 || data-sort-value="0.52" | 520 m || multiple || 2001–2013 || 05 May 2013 || 81 || align=left | Disc.: NEAT || 
|- id="2001 PV65" bgcolor=#fefefe
| 1 ||  || MBA-I || 17.9 || data-sort-value="0.78" | 780 m || multiple || 2001–2019 || 27 Nov 2019 || 104 || align=left | Disc.: AMOS || 
|- id="2001 PT66" bgcolor=#d6d6d6
| 0 ||  || MBA-O || 16.7 || 2.5 km || multiple || 2001–2018 || 09 Nov 2018 || 63 || align=left | Disc.: NEATAlt.: 2012 NH1 || 
|- id="2001 PO67" bgcolor=#E9E9E9
| 1 ||  || MBA-M || 17.7 || 1.6 km || multiple || 2001–2021 || 18 Jan 2021 || 74 || align=left | Disc.: AMOSAlt.: 2015 VJ125 || 
|- id="2001 PR67" bgcolor=#fefefe
| 0 ||  || MBA-I || 17.6 || data-sort-value="0.90" | 900 m || multiple || 2001–2021 || 18 Jan 2021 || 110 || align=left | Disc.: NEATAlt.: 2005 UW502, 2016 WS26 || 
|- id="2001 PS67" bgcolor=#E9E9E9
| 0 ||  || MBA-M || 16.65 || 2.0 km || multiple || 2001–2021 || 17 Apr 2021 || 241 || align=left | Disc.: NEATAlt.: 2012 BM130, 2013 GE86, 2014 NS58 || 
|- id="2001 PV67" bgcolor=#E9E9E9
| 0 ||  || MBA-M || 16.99 || 1.7 km || multiple || 2001–2021 || 13 May 2021 || 165 || align=left | Disc.: AMOS || 
|- id="2001 PW67" bgcolor=#fefefe
| 0 ||  || MBA-I || 18.19 || data-sort-value="0.68" | 680 m || multiple || 2001–2021 || 01 Nov 2021 || 160 || align=left | Disc.: AMOS || 
|- id="2001 PY67" bgcolor=#fefefe
| 2 ||  || MBA-I || 18.7 || data-sort-value="0.54" | 540 m || multiple || 2001–2016 || 07 May 2016 || 29 || align=left | Disc.: NEAT || 
|- id="2001 PZ67" bgcolor=#fefefe
| 0 ||  || MBA-I || 18.4 || data-sort-value="0.62" | 620 m || multiple || 2001–2019 || 15 Nov 2019 || 87 || align=left | Disc.: AMOS || 
|- id="2001 PB68" bgcolor=#E9E9E9
| 0 ||  || MBA-M || 17.2 || 1.5 km || multiple || 2001–2019 || 28 Nov 2019 || 39 || align=left | Disc.: NEAT || 
|- id="2001 PC68" bgcolor=#E9E9E9
| 0 ||  || MBA-M || 17.43 || data-sort-value="0.97" | 970 m || multiple || 2001–2021 || 28 Jul 2021 || 47 || align=left | Disc.: NEAT || 
|- id="2001 PF68" bgcolor=#fefefe
| 2 ||  || MBA-I || 18.6 || data-sort-value="0.57" | 570 m || multiple || 2001–2019 || 06 Apr 2019 || 33 || align=left | Disc.: AMOSAdded on 9 March 2021 || 
|}
back to top

Q 

|- id="2001 QJ" bgcolor=#FFC2E0
| 1 || 2001 QJ || AMO || 21.2 || data-sort-value="0.20" | 200 m || multiple || 2001–2019 || 05 Nov 2019 || 51 || align=left | Disc.: LINEAR || 
|- id="2001 QP2" bgcolor=#FA8072
| 1 ||  || MCA || 18.1 || data-sort-value="0.71" | 710 m || multiple || 2001–2015 || 20 Jun 2015 || 80 || align=left | Disc.: LINEAR || 
|- id="2001 QS2" bgcolor=#fefefe
| 2 ||  || MBA-I || 18.3 || data-sort-value="0.65" | 650 m || multiple || 2001–2019 || 25 Nov 2019 || 133 || align=left | Disc.: Prescott Obs.Alt.: 2016 QS32 || 
|- id="2001 QU2" bgcolor=#fefefe
| 0 ||  || MBA-I || 17.6 || data-sort-value="0.90" | 900 m || multiple || 2001–2021 || 08 Jan 2021 || 84 || align=left | Disc.: LINEAR || 
|- id="2001 QF6" bgcolor=#C7FF8F
| 0 ||  || CEN || 15.52 || 5.0 km || multiple || 1982–2022 || 22 Jan 2022 || 144 || align=left | Disc.: LINEAR, albedo: 0.040 || 
|- id="2001 QJ6" bgcolor=#E9E9E9
| 1 ||  || MBA-M || 17.68 || data-sort-value="0.87" | 870 m || multiple || 2001–2021 || 09 Jul 2021 || 53 || align=left | Disc.: LINEARAlt.: 2005 NG48 || 
|- id="2001 QJ9" bgcolor=#E9E9E9
| 0 ||  || MBA-M || 16.20 || 2.4 km || multiple || 2001–2021 || 15 May 2021 || 402 || align=left | Disc.: LINEAR || 
|- id="2001 QA32" bgcolor=#FA8072
| 0 ||  || MCA || 18.72 || data-sort-value="0.54" | 540 m || multiple || 2001–2021 || 31 May 2021 || 72 || align=left | Disc.: LINEARAlt.: 2008 VF75 || 
|- id="2001 QR33" bgcolor=#FA8072
| 1 ||  || MCA || 19.4 || data-sort-value="0.39" | 390 m || multiple || 2001–2019 || 18 Nov 2019 || 103 || align=left | Disc.: NEAT || 
|- id="2001 QT33" bgcolor=#FA8072
| 6 ||  || MCA || 19.9 || data-sort-value="0.31" | 310 m || single || 60 days || 16 Oct 2001 || 40 || align=left | Disc.: NEAT || 
|- id="2001 QZ33" bgcolor=#FA8072
| 0 ||  || MCA || 17.53 || 1.7 km || multiple || 2001–2021 || 01 Jul 2021 || 97 || align=left | Disc.: LINEAR || 
|- id="2001 QA34" bgcolor=#FA8072
| 3 ||  || MCA || 19.0 || data-sort-value="0.67" | 670 m || multiple || 2001–2018 || 29 Sep 2018 || 48 || align=left | Disc.: NEAT || 
|- id="2001 QB34" bgcolor=#FFC2E0
| 0 ||  || AMO || 19.69 || data-sort-value="0.41" | 410 m || multiple || 2001–2014 || 23 Nov 2014 || 69 || align=left | Disc.: NEAT || 
|- id="2001 QC34" bgcolor=#FFC2E0
| 0 ||  || APO || 20.20 || data-sort-value="0.32" | 320 m || multiple || 2001–2020 || 14 Jul 2020 || 609 || align=left | Disc.: NEATPotentially hazardous object || 
|- id="2001 QD34" bgcolor=#FFC2E0
| 7 ||  || AMO || 22.8 || data-sort-value="0.098" | 98 m || single || 10 days || 27 Aug 2001 || 30 || align=left | Disc.: LINEAR || 
|- id="2001 QE34" bgcolor=#FFC2E0
| 0 ||  || APO || 19.0 || data-sort-value="0.56" | 560 m || multiple || 2001–2020 || 16 Oct 2020 || 397 || align=left | Disc.: LINEAR || 
|- id="2001 QM44" bgcolor=#fefefe
| 1 ||  || MBA-I || 17.9 || data-sort-value="0.78" | 780 m || multiple || 2001–2021 || 17 Jan 2021 || 68 || align=left | Disc.: LINEAR || 
|- id="2001 QC45" bgcolor=#E9E9E9
| 0 ||  || MBA-M || 17.09 || 1.6 km || multiple || 2001–2021 || 09 Apr 2021 || 169 || align=left | Disc.: LINEAR || 
|- id="2001 QD50" bgcolor=#fefefe
| 0 ||  || MBA-I || 17.5 || data-sort-value="0.94" | 940 m || multiple || 2001–2021 || 18 Jan 2021 || 114 || align=left | Disc.: LINEARAlt.: 2012 RP40 || 
|- id="2001 QN50" bgcolor=#E9E9E9
| 0 ||  || MBA-M || 17.00 || 1.7 km || multiple || 2001–2021 || 09 Apr 2021 || 304 || align=left | Disc.: LINEAR || 
|- id="2001 QE71" bgcolor=#FFC2E0
| 6 ||  || APO || 24.4 || data-sort-value="0.047" | 47 m || single || 25 days || 13 Sep 2001 || 68 || align=left | Disc.: LINEAR || 
|- id="2001 QL72" bgcolor=#fefefe
| 0 ||  || MBA-I || 18.4 || data-sort-value="0.62" | 620 m || multiple || 2001–2020 || 11 Oct 2020 || 108 || align=left | Disc.: SpacewatchAlt.: 2005 SU86 || 
|- id="2001 QO72" bgcolor=#FA8072
| 5 ||  || MCA || 19.1 || data-sort-value="0.45" | 450 m || single || 67 days || 15 Oct 2001 || 55 || align=left | Disc.: NEAT || 
|- id="2001 QO85" bgcolor=#E9E9E9
| 0 ||  || MBA-M || 16.6 || 2.7 km || multiple || 2001–2021 || 17 Jan 2021 || 182 || align=left | Disc.: LINEARAlt.: 2006 WO196 || 
|- id="2001 QJ86" bgcolor=#FA8072
| 0 ||  || MCA || 18.69 || data-sort-value="0.54" | 540 m || multiple || 2001–2021 || 12 Jun 2021 || 97 || align=left | Disc.: NEAT || 
|- id="2001 QR87" bgcolor=#fefefe
| 0 ||  || MBA-I || 17.8 || data-sort-value="0.82" | 820 m || multiple || 1998–2019 || 24 Dec 2019 || 103 || align=left | Disc.: AMOS || 
|- id="2001 QU87" bgcolor=#E9E9E9
| 0 ||  || MBA-M || 18.35 || data-sort-value="0.64" | 640 m || multiple || 2001–2021 || 07 Apr 2021 || 43 || align=left | Disc.: AMOS || 
|- id="2001 QC88" bgcolor=#fefefe
| 2 ||  || MBA-I || 19.35 || data-sort-value="0.31" | 410 m || multiple || 2001-2022 || 24 Oct 2022 || 48 || align=left | Disc.: SpacewatchAlt.: 2022 OF50 || 
|- id="2001 QG88" bgcolor=#fefefe
| 0 ||  || MBA-I || 18.5 || data-sort-value="0.59" | 590 m || multiple || 2001–2019 || 01 Jul 2019 || 40 || align=left | Disc.: SpacewatchAlt.: 2005 UY347 || 
|- id="2001 QP88" bgcolor=#d6d6d6
| 0 ||  || MBA-O || 17.7 || 1.6 km || multiple || 2001–2019 || 14 Jan 2019 || 50 || align=left | Disc.: Spacewatch || 
|- id="2001 QL89" bgcolor=#E9E9E9
| 0 ||  || MBA-M || 16.8 || 1.3 km || multiple || 2001–2021 || 11 Jun 2021 || 205 || align=left | Disc.: NEAT || 
|- id="2001 QR92" bgcolor=#fefefe
| 0 ||  || MBA-I || 17.59 || data-sort-value="0.90" | 900 m || multiple || 2001–2022 || 26 Jan 2022 || 264 || align=left | Disc.: LINEARAlt.: 2009 XW5 || 
|- id="2001 QU92" bgcolor=#E9E9E9
| 1 ||  || MBA-M || 18.15 || data-sort-value="0.70" | 700 m || multiple || 2001–2021 || 08 Jun 2021 || 32 || align=left | Disc.: LINEAR || 
|- id="2001 QB95" bgcolor=#d6d6d6
| 1 ||  || MBA-O || 16.9 || 2.3 km || multiple || 2001–2019 || 24 Dec 2019 || 38 || align=left | Disc.: Spacewatch || 
|- id="2001 QQ95" bgcolor=#d6d6d6
| 0 ||  || MBA-O || 16.4 || 2.9 km || multiple || 1994–2020 || 24 Dec 2020 || 99 || align=left | Disc.: Spacewatch || 
|- id="2001 QT95" bgcolor=#fefefe
| 0 ||  || MBA-I || 18.5 || data-sort-value="0.59" | 590 m || multiple || 2001–2019 || 15 Nov 2019 || 92 || align=left | Disc.: Spacewatch || 
|- id="2001 QZ95" bgcolor=#E9E9E9
| 0 ||  || MBA-M || 17.2 || 2.0 km || multiple || 2001–2020 || 19 Oct 2020 || 78 || align=left | Disc.: Spacewatch || 
|- id="2001 QA96" bgcolor=#fefefe
| 0 ||  || MBA-I || 18.98 || data-sort-value="0.48" | 480 m || multiple || 2001–2021 || 02 Oct 2021 || 73 || align=left | Disc.: Spacewatch || 
|- id="2001 QF96" bgcolor=#FFC2E0
| 4 ||  || APO || 24.5 || data-sort-value="0.045" | 45 m || single || 26 days || 13 Sep 2001 || 59 || align=left | Disc.: Spacewatch || 
|- id="2001 QJ96" bgcolor=#FFC2E0
| 0 ||  || APO || 22.27 || data-sort-value="0.12" | 120 m || multiple || 2001–2021 || 03 Sep 2021 || 76 || align=left | Disc.: LONEOSAlt.: 2015 PK229 || 
|- id="2001 QB98" bgcolor=#FA8072
| 0 ||  || MCA || 17.8 || data-sort-value="0.82" | 820 m || multiple || 2001–2019 || 28 Dec 2019 || 115 || align=left | Disc.: LINEARAlt.: 2012 VX45 || 
|- id="2001 QZ99" bgcolor=#FA8072
| 0 ||  || MCA || 17.2 || 2.0 km || multiple || 2001–2021 || 18 Jan 2021 || 423 || align=left | Disc.: LINEAR || 
|- id="2001 QR100" bgcolor=#E9E9E9
| 0 ||  || MBA-M || 16.7 || 1.9 km || multiple || 2001–2018 || 09 Aug 2018 || 136 || align=left | Disc.: NEAT || 
|- id="2001 QQ102" bgcolor=#E9E9E9
| 0 ||  || MBA-M || 17.1 || 1.6 km || multiple || 2001–2020 || 26 Jan 2020 || 114 || align=left | Disc.: LINEAR || 
|- id="2001 QQ106" bgcolor=#E9E9E9
| 0 ||  || MBA-M || 17.09 || 1.6 km || multiple || 2001–2021 || 07 Mar 2021 || 205 || align=left | Disc.: LINEAR || 
|- id="2001 QX106" bgcolor=#E9E9E9
| 0 ||  || MBA-M || 17.86 || data-sort-value="0.80" | 800 m || multiple || 2001–2021 || 18 May 2021 || 47 || align=left | Disc.: LINEAR || 
|- id="2001 QD107" bgcolor=#FA8072
| 1 ||  || HUN || 17.5 || data-sort-value="0.94" | 940 m || multiple || 2001–2020 || 02 Jan 2020 || 310 || align=left | Disc.: LINEAR || 
|- id="2001 QL107" bgcolor=#fefefe
| 1 ||  || HUN || 17.7 || data-sort-value="0.86" | 860 m || multiple || 2001–2021 || 16 Jan 2021 || 78 || align=left | Disc.: LINEAR || 
|- id="2001 QM107" bgcolor=#fefefe
| 1 ||  || MBA-I || 17.6 || data-sort-value="0.90" | 900 m || multiple || 2001–2020 || 29 Jan 2020 || 103 || align=left | Disc.: LINEAR || 
|- id="2001 QN107" bgcolor=#fefefe
| 0 ||  || HUN || 17.9 || data-sort-value="0.78" | 780 m || multiple || 1996–2021 || 09 Jan 2021 || 217 || align=left | Disc.: LINEARAlt.: 2012 VT82 || 
|- id="2001 QR108" bgcolor=#FA8072
| 0 ||  || MCA || 18.9 || data-sort-value="0.49" | 490 m || multiple || 2001–2020 || 20 Jul 2020 || 99 || align=left | Disc.: NEAT || 
|- id="2001 QS108" bgcolor=#FA8072
| 0 ||  || MCA || 19.05 || data-sort-value="0.46" | 460 m || multiple || 2001–2021 || 28 Nov 2021 || 169 || align=left | Disc.: LINEAR || 
|- id="2001 QT108" bgcolor=#FA8072
| 0 ||  || MCA || 18.0 || 1.1 km || multiple || 2001–2020 || 23 Jan 2020 || 163 || align=left | Disc.: LINEAR || 
|- id="2001 QV108" bgcolor=#FA8072
| 1 ||  || MCA || 19.4 || data-sort-value="0.39" | 390 m || multiple || 2001–2019 || 27 May 2019 || 86 || align=left | Disc.: LONEOS || 
|- id="2001 QP110" bgcolor=#E9E9E9
| 1 ||  || MBA-M || 17.3 || 2.0 km || multiple || 2001–2019 || 20 Dec 2019 || 97 || align=left | Disc.: Ondřejov Obs. || 
|- id="2001 QW110" bgcolor=#d6d6d6
| 0 ||  || MBA-O || 16.7 || 2.5 km || multiple || 1991–2020 || 29 Mar 2020 || 59 || align=left | Disc.: Ondřejov Obs.Alt.: 2001 QZ142 || 
|- id="2001 QE111" bgcolor=#E9E9E9
| 0 ||  || MBA-M || 16.78 || 1.9 km || multiple || 2001–2020 || 27 Jan 2020 || 53 || align=left | Disc.: LINEAR || 
|- id="2001 QH111" bgcolor=#E9E9E9
| 0 ||  || MBA-M || 17.07 || 1.1 km || multiple || 2001–2021 || 17 Apr 2021 || 114 || align=left | Disc.: NEAT || 
|- id="2001 QH112" bgcolor=#E9E9E9
| 0 ||  || MBA-M || 17.8 || 1.2 km || multiple || 2001–2020 || 26 Jan 2020 || 77 || align=left | Disc.: LINEARAlt.: 2014 RG53 || 
|- id="2001 QN112" bgcolor=#FA8072
| 1 ||  || MCA || 18.23 || data-sort-value="0.68" | 680 m || multiple || 2001-2022 || 30 Dec 2022 || 85 || align=left | Disc.: LINEAR || 
|- id="2001 QZ114" bgcolor=#E9E9E9
| 0 ||  || MBA-M || 16.9 || 1.8 km || multiple || 2001–2018 || 17 Jul 2018 || 142 || align=left | Disc.: LINEAR || 
|- id="2001 QW116" bgcolor=#FA8072
| 1 ||  || MCA || 17.2 || 1.5 km || multiple || 2001–2020 || 25 Jan 2020 || 141 || align=left | Disc.: LINEAR || 
|- id="2001 QE119" bgcolor=#fefefe
| 1 ||  || MBA-I || 18.0 || data-sort-value="0.75" | 750 m || multiple || 2001–2019 || 20 Dec 2019 || 193 || align=left | Disc.: LINEAR || 
|- id="2001 QS121" bgcolor=#d6d6d6
| 0 ||  || MBA-O || 16.4 || 2.9 km || multiple || 2001–2019 || 20 Dec 2019 || 68 || align=left | Disc.: LINEAR || 
|- id="2001 QO126" bgcolor=#E9E9E9
| 0 ||  || MBA-M || 16.5 || 1.5 km || multiple || 2001–2021 || 14 Jun 2021 || 129 || align=left | Disc.: LINEARAlt.: 2013 NO || 
|- id="2001 QP127" bgcolor=#fefefe
| 0 ||  || MBA-I || 17.8 || data-sort-value="0.82" | 820 m || multiple || 2001–2020 || 18 Jul 2020 || 186 || align=left | Disc.: LINEAR || 
|- id="2001 QS129" bgcolor=#d6d6d6
| 2 ||  || MBA-O || 16.2 || 3.2 km || multiple || 2001–2020 || 29 Jan 2020 || 109 || align=left | Disc.: LINEARAlt.: 2007 RF243 || 
|- id="2001 QO132" bgcolor=#E9E9E9
| 2 ||  || MBA-M || 17.5 || 1.3 km || multiple || 2001–2018 || 13 Jul 2018 || 35 || align=left | Disc.: LINEAR || 
|- id="2001 QJ133" bgcolor=#FA8072
| 0 ||  || MCA || 18.15 || data-sort-value="0.70" | 700 m || multiple || 2001–2022 || 05 Jan 2022 || 177 || align=left | Disc.: LINEAR || 
|- id="2001 QF136" bgcolor=#FA8072
| 0 ||  || MCA || 18.53 || data-sort-value="0.58" | 580 m || multiple || 2001–2021 || 03 Dec 2021 || 284 || align=left | Disc.: LINEAR || 
|- id="2001 QY140" bgcolor=#FA8072
| 0 ||  || MCA || 18.9 || data-sort-value="0.49" | 490 m || multiple || 1995–2020 || 17 Oct 2020 || 127 || align=left | Disc.: LINEAR || 
|- id="2001 QJ141" bgcolor=#E9E9E9
| 0 ||  || MBA-M || 17.53 || data-sort-value="0.93" | 930 m || multiple || 2001–2021 || 08 May 2021 || 130 || align=left | Disc.: LINEAR || 
|- id="2001 QG142" bgcolor=#FFC2E0
| 0 ||  || AMO || 18.2 || data-sort-value="0.81" | 810 m || multiple || 2001–2019 || 29 May 2019 || 238 || align=left | Disc.: LINEARNEO larger than 1 kilometer || 
|- id="2001 QJ142" bgcolor=#FFC2E0
| 2 ||  || APO || 23.7 || data-sort-value="0.065" | 65 m || multiple || 2001–2012 || 25 Nov 2012 || 91 || align=left | Disc.: LINEAR || 
|- id="2001 QM142" bgcolor=#FFC2E0
| 2 ||  || APO || 22.6 || data-sort-value="0.11" | 110 m || multiple || 2001–2017 || 18 Apr 2017 || 41 || align=left | Disc.: Spacewatch || 
|- id="2001 QN142" bgcolor=#FFC2E0
| 1 ||  || APO || 21.7 || data-sort-value="0.16" | 160 m || multiple || 2001–2012 || 29 May 2012 || 56 || align=left | Disc.: LINEARAlt.: 2012 HP2 || 
|- id="2001 QO142" bgcolor=#FFC2E0
| 2 ||  || APO || 19.3 || data-sort-value="0.49" | 490 m || multiple || 2001–2008 || 07 May 2008 || 57 || align=left | Disc.: LINEAR || 
|- id="2001 QP142" bgcolor=#FFC2E0
| 8 ||  || AMO || 24.1 || data-sort-value="0.054" | 54 m || single || 26 days || 20 Sep 2001 || 24 || align=left | Disc.: LINEAR || 
|- id="2001 QT144" bgcolor=#E9E9E9
| 2 ||  || MBA-M || 18.0 || data-sort-value="0.75" | 750 m || multiple || 2001–2021 || 10 Sep 2021 || 33 || align=left | Disc.: SpacewatchAdded on 30 September 2021 || 
|- id="2001 QC145" bgcolor=#d6d6d6
| 0 ||  || MBA-O || 17.3 || 1.9 km || multiple || 2001–2020 || 26 Jan 2020 || 56 || align=left | Disc.: SpacewatchAdded on 24 August 2020Alt.: 2018 TO19 || 
|- id="2001 QS145" bgcolor=#E9E9E9
| 0 ||  || MBA-M || 16.62 || 2.0 km || multiple || 2001–2021 || 10 Apr 2021 || 159 || align=left | Disc.: SpacewatchAlt.: 2009 LP6, 2010 NP2 || 
|- id="2001 QW150" bgcolor=#FA8072
| 1 ||  || HUN || 18.3 || data-sort-value="0.65" | 650 m || multiple || 2001–2021 || 16 Jun 2021 || 47 || align=left | Disc.: LINEARAlt.: 2019 WA19 || 
|- id="2001 QZ152" bgcolor=#fefefe
| 0 ||  || MBA-I || 18.32 || data-sort-value="0.64" | 640 m || multiple || 2001–2021 || 30 Oct 2021 || 96 || align=left | Disc.: Ondřejov Obs.Alt.: 2012 KQ6 || 
|- id="2001 QJ153" bgcolor=#FA8072
| 0 ||  || MCA || 17.0 || 2.3 km || multiple || 2001–2020 || 14 Feb 2020 || 256 || align=left | Disc.: NEAT || 
|- id="2001 QK153" bgcolor=#FFC2E0
| 5 ||  || APO || 20.6 || data-sort-value="0.27" | 270 m || single || 45 days || 11 Oct 2001 || 22 || align=left | Disc.: LINEAR || 
|- id="2001 QL153" bgcolor=#FFC2E0
| 1 ||  || AMO || 19.0 || data-sort-value="0.56" | 560 m || multiple || 2001–2008 || 17 Sep 2008 || 60 || align=left | Disc.: NEAT || 
|- id="2001 QV153" bgcolor=#E9E9E9
| 0 ||  || MBA-M || 17.52 || data-sort-value="0.93" | 930 m || multiple || 2001–2021 || 26 Oct 2021 || 74 || align=left | Disc.: Ondřejov Obs. || 
|- id="2001 QQ154" bgcolor=#FA8072
| 0 ||  || MCA || 16.8 || 1.8 km || multiple || 2001–2020 || 29 Jan 2020 || 230 || align=left | Disc.: LINEAR || 
|- id="2001 QL163" bgcolor=#FFC2E0
| 8 ||  || APO || 22.6 || data-sort-value="0.11" | 110 m || single || 13 days || 07 Sep 2001 || 19 || align=left | Disc.: LINEAR || 
|- id="2001 QM163" bgcolor=#FFC2E0
| 3 ||  || APO || 19.8 || data-sort-value="0.39" | 390 m || multiple || 2001–2008 || 26 Sep 2008 || 34 || align=left | Disc.: NEAT || 
|- id="2001 QT164" bgcolor=#fefefe
| 0 ||  || MBA-I || 18.63 || data-sort-value="0.56" | 560 m || multiple || 2001–2022 || 26 Jan 2022 || 67 || align=left | Disc.: AMOS || 
|- id="2001 QX164" bgcolor=#fefefe
| 0 ||  || MBA-I || 17.6 || data-sort-value="0.90" | 900 m || multiple || 2001–2021 || 03 Jan 2021 || 119 || align=left | Disc.: AMOSAlt.: 2005 UX485 || 
|- id="2001 QL169" bgcolor=#FA8072
| 2 ||  || MCA || 17.8 || 1.5 km || multiple || 2001–2012 || 13 Oct 2012 || 60 || align=left | Disc.: NEAT || 
|- id="2001 QE170" bgcolor=#d6d6d6
| 0 ||  || MBA-O || 16.2 || 3.2 km || multiple || 2001–2020 || 31 Jan 2020 || 61 || align=left | Disc.: LINEARAlt.: 2013 WW50 || 
|- id="2001 QD172" bgcolor=#fefefe
| 0 ||  || MBA-I || 17.97 || data-sort-value="0.76" | 760 m || multiple || 2001–2021 || 09 May 2021 || 120 || align=left | Disc.: LINEARAlt.: 2008 SN292 || 
|- id="2001 QS172" bgcolor=#E9E9E9
| 0 ||  || MBA-M || 17.4 || 1.4 km || multiple || 2001–2019 || 03 Dec 2019 || 51 || align=left | Disc.: LINEAR || 
|- id="2001 QC173" bgcolor=#E9E9E9
| 0 ||  || MBA-M || 17.30 || 1.5 km || multiple || 2001–2021 || 15 Apr 2021 || 129 || align=left | Disc.: LINEARAlt.: 2010 OU122, 2014 QS389 || 
|- id="2001 QG173" bgcolor=#fefefe
| 1 ||  || MBA-I || 18.4 || data-sort-value="0.62" | 620 m || multiple || 2001–2021 || 16 Jan 2021 || 86 || align=left | Disc.: LINEAR || 
|- id="2001 QQ173" bgcolor=#FA8072
| 0 ||  || MCA || 18.8 || data-sort-value="0.52" | 520 m || multiple || 1998–2020 || 18 Jul 2020 || 89 || align=left | Disc.: LINEAR || 
|- id="2001 QN175" bgcolor=#fefefe
| 0 ||  || MBA-I || 18.4 || data-sort-value="0.62" | 620 m || multiple || 2001–2020 || 10 Dec 2020 || 62 || align=left | Disc.: Spacewatch || 
|- id="2001 QA176" bgcolor=#fefefe
| 2 ||  || MBA-I || 18.8 || data-sort-value="0.52" | 520 m || multiple || 2001–2016 || 05 Nov 2016 || 30 || align=left | Disc.: SpacewatchAdded on 21 August 2021Alt.: 2005 VE20 || 
|- id="2001 QJ176" bgcolor=#E9E9E9
| 0 ||  || MBA-M || 18.2 || data-sort-value="0.96" | 960 m || multiple || 2001–2018 || 13 Aug 2018 || 33 || align=left | Disc.: Spacewatch || 
|- id="2001 QB177" bgcolor=#FA8072
| 1 ||  || MCA || 18.98 || data-sort-value="0.48" | 480 m || multiple || 2001–2021 || 28 Nov 2021 || 60 || align=left | Disc.: Spacewatch || 
|- id="2001 QF178" bgcolor=#E9E9E9
| 0 ||  || MBA-M || 17.25 || 1.5 km || multiple || 2001–2021 || 09 May 2021 || 140 || align=left | Disc.: Kvistaberg Obs. || 
|- id="2001 QS182" bgcolor=#E9E9E9
| 0 ||  || MBA-M || 17.0 || 1.2 km || multiple || 2001–2020 || 02 Feb 2020 || 99 || align=left | Disc.: NEAT || 
|- id="2001 QH185" bgcolor=#E9E9E9
| 0 ||  || MBA-M || 17.1 || 1.6 km || multiple || 2001–2017 || 25 Feb 2017 || 133 || align=left | Disc.: LINEAR || 
|- id="2001 QN186" bgcolor=#d6d6d6
| 0 ||  || MBA-O || 17.9 || 1.5 km || multiple || 2001–2017 || 06 Nov 2017 || 90 || align=left | Disc.: Spacewatch || 
|- id="2001 QK187" bgcolor=#d6d6d6
| 0 ||  || MBA-O || 16.2 || 3.2 km || multiple || 2001–2019 || 05 Feb 2019 || 283 || align=left | Disc.: NEAT || 
|- id="2001 QN187" bgcolor=#E9E9E9
| 0 ||  || MBA-M || 17.2 || 2.0 km || multiple || 2001–2020 || 17 Dec 2020 || 180 || align=left | Disc.: AMOS || 
|- id="2001 QT188" bgcolor=#E9E9E9
| 0 ||  || MBA-M || 17.3 || 1.9 km || multiple || 2001–2021 || 06 Jan 2021 || 125 || align=left | Disc.: Spacewatch || 
|- id="2001 QU188" bgcolor=#E9E9E9
| 0 ||  || MBA-M || 17.0 || 1.7 km || multiple || 2001–2021 || 15 Jan 2021 || 120 || align=left | Disc.: Spacewatch || 
|- id="2001 QW189" bgcolor=#E9E9E9
| 0 ||  || MBA-M || 17.29 || 1.5 km || multiple || 2001–2021 || 01 May 2021 || 143 || align=left | Disc.: LINEAR || 
|- id="2001 QU190" bgcolor=#E9E9E9
| 1 ||  || MBA-M || 17.2 || 1.5 km || multiple || 2001–2018 || 04 Dec 2018 || 104 || align=left | Disc.: LINEARAlt.: 2014 WS67 || 
|- id="2001 QK195" bgcolor=#E9E9E9
| 0 ||  || MBA-M || 17.43 || data-sort-value="0.97" | 970 m || multiple || 2001–2021 || 30 Jul 2021 || 102 || align=left | Disc.: LINEAR || 
|- id="2001 QO196" bgcolor=#fefefe
| 0 ||  || MBA-I || 17.5 || data-sort-value="0.94" | 940 m || multiple || 2001–2020 || 17 Dec 2020 || 212 || align=left | Disc.: AMOSAlt.: 2010 FK124 || 
|- id="2001 QQ196" bgcolor=#E9E9E9
| 1 ||  || MBA-M || 17.71 || data-sort-value="0.85" | 850 m || multiple || 2001–2021 || 15 May 2021 || 60 || align=left | Disc.: Spacewatch || 
|- id="2001 QL202" bgcolor=#fefefe
| 0 ||  || MBA-I || 17.4 || data-sort-value="0.98" | 980 m || multiple || 1993–2020 || 15 Dec 2020 || 139 || align=left | Disc.: LONEOSAlt.: 2012 PV30 || 
|- id="2001 QP202" bgcolor=#E9E9E9
| 0 ||  || MBA-M || 17.2 || 1.5 km || multiple || 2001–2020 || 04 Jan 2020 || 174 || align=left | Disc.: LONEOSAlt.: 2010 VO162 || 
|- id="2001 QK205" bgcolor=#FA8072
| 0 ||  || MCA || 18.2 || data-sort-value="0.68" | 680 m || multiple || 2001–2019 || 31 Oct 2019 || 130 || align=left | Disc.: LINEAR || 
|- id="2001 QL205" bgcolor=#E9E9E9
| 3 ||  || MBA-M || 17.9 || data-sort-value="0.78" | 780 m || multiple || 2001–2019 || 11 Jan 2019 || 26 || align=left | Disc.: LINEAR || 
|- id="2001 QW205" bgcolor=#E9E9E9
| 0 ||  || MBA-M || 17.5 || 1.8 km || multiple || 2001–2021 || 09 Jan 2021 || 150 || align=left | Disc.: LONEOSAlt.: 2015 RO19 || 
|- id="2001 QB207" bgcolor=#d6d6d6
| 1 ||  || MBA-O || 17.4 || 1.8 km || multiple || 2001–2018 || 09 Nov 2018 || 66 || align=left | Disc.: LINEAR || 
|- id="2001 QD207" bgcolor=#d6d6d6
| 0 ||  || MBA-O || 15.30 || 4.8 km || multiple || 2001–2021 || 18 Apr 2021 || 119 || align=left | Disc.: LINEARAlt.: 2010 KE104, 2017 KN31 || 
|- id="2001 QM208" bgcolor=#d6d6d6
| 0 ||  || MBA-O || 16.29 || 3.1 km || multiple || 2001–2021 || 15 May 2021 || 115 || align=left | Disc.: LONEOSAlt.: 2012 TV70 || 
|- id="2001 QO209" bgcolor=#E9E9E9
| 0 ||  || MBA-M || 17.5 || 1.3 km || multiple || 2001–2019 || 02 Nov 2019 || 53 || align=left | Disc.: LONEOSAlt.: 2010 RB182 || 
|- id="2001 QR209" bgcolor=#fefefe
| 1 ||  || MBA-I || 18.34 || data-sort-value="0.64" | 640 m || multiple || 2001–2021 || 06 Apr 2021 || 45 || align=left | Disc.: LONEOSAlt.: 2015 TD263 || 
|- id="2001 QS209" bgcolor=#E9E9E9
| 1 ||  || MBA-M || 17.4 || data-sort-value="0.98" | 980 m || multiple || 2001–2014 || 21 Dec 2014 || 32 || align=left | Disc.: LONEOS || 
|- id="2001 QO210" bgcolor=#fefefe
| 0 ||  || MBA-I || 17.1 || 1.1 km || multiple || 2001–2021 || 04 Jan 2021 || 272 || align=left | Disc.: Desert Eagle Obs. || 
|- id="2001 QP210" bgcolor=#fefefe
| 0 ||  || MBA-I || 18.60 || data-sort-value="0.57" | 570 m || multiple || 2001–2021 || 09 Nov 2021 || 72 || align=left | Disc.: LONEOS || 
|- id="2001 QO212" bgcolor=#E9E9E9
| 0 ||  || MBA-M || 17.58 || 1.3 km || multiple || 2001–2021 || 15 Apr 2021 || 152 || align=left | Disc.: LONEOS || 
|- id="2001 QE213" bgcolor=#fefefe
| 0 ||  || MBA-I || 18.1 || data-sort-value="0.71" | 710 m || multiple || 2001–2019 || 13 Nov 2019 || 117 || align=left | Disc.: LONEOSAlt.: 2012 TW195 || 
|- id="2001 QD215" bgcolor=#E9E9E9
| 1 ||  || MBA-M || 17.2 || 1.5 km || multiple || 2001–2020 || 26 Jan 2020 || 222 || align=left | Disc.: LONEOS || 
|- id="2001 QX224" bgcolor=#fefefe
| 2 ||  || MBA-I || 18.7 || data-sort-value="0.54" | 540 m || multiple || 2001–2013 || 26 Nov 2013 || 26 || align=left | Disc.: SpacewatchAdded on 22 July 2020Alt.: 2009 UA134 || 
|- id="2001 QY224" bgcolor=#fefefe
| 0 ||  || MBA-I || 17.7 || data-sort-value="0.86" | 860 m || multiple || 2001–2021 || 04 Jan 2021 || 79 || align=left | Disc.: NEATAlt.: 2016 WX17 || 
|- id="2001 QA225" bgcolor=#FA8072
| 2 ||  || MCA || 18.3 || data-sort-value="0.92" | 920 m || multiple || 2001–2018 || 12 Nov 2018 || 55 || align=left | Disc.: NEAT || 
|- id="2001 QN225" bgcolor=#E9E9E9
| 0 ||  || MBA-M || 17.46 || 1.4 km || multiple || 2001–2021 || 07 Apr 2021 || 102 || align=left | Disc.: LONEOSAlt.: 2014 QB405 || 
|- id="2001 QY226" bgcolor=#fefefe
| 1 ||  || HUN || 18.1 || data-sort-value="0.71" | 710 m || multiple || 2001–2020 || 17 Nov 2020 || 213 || align=left | Disc.: LONEOS || 
|- id="2001 QY227" bgcolor=#E9E9E9
| 1 ||  || MBA-M || 17.3 || 1.5 km || multiple || 2001–2019 || 05 Nov 2019 || 52 || align=left | Disc.: LONEOS || 
|- id="2001 QC229" bgcolor=#d6d6d6
| 1 ||  || MBA-O || 16.6 || 2.7 km || multiple || 2001–2019 || 02 Jan 2019 || 69 || align=left | Disc.: LONEOS || 
|- id="2001 QB232" bgcolor=#E9E9E9
| 0 ||  || MBA-M || 17.5 || 1.3 km || multiple || 2001–2020 || 26 Jan 2020 || 68 || align=left | Disc.: LONEOSAlt.: 2014 MX8 || 
|- id="2001 QG236" bgcolor=#fefefe
| 2 ||  || MBA-I || 18.2 || data-sort-value="0.68" | 680 m || multiple || 2001–2020 || 06 Dec 2020 || 51 || align=left | Disc.: LINEAR || 
|- id="2001 QE237" bgcolor=#E9E9E9
| 2 ||  || MBA-M || 17.4 || data-sort-value="0.98" | 980 m || multiple || 2001–2015 || 22 Jan 2015 || 76 || align=left | Disc.: LINEAR || 
|- id="2001 QM252" bgcolor=#E9E9E9
| 0 ||  || MBA-M || 16.7 || 1.4 km || multiple || 2001–2021 || 07 Jun 2021 || 139 || align=left | Disc.: LINEAR || 
|- id="2001 QL253" bgcolor=#E9E9E9
| 0 ||  || MBA-M || 17.34 || 1.4 km || multiple || 2001–2021 || 12 May 2021 || 103 || align=left | Disc.: LINEARAlt.: 2014 SM247, 2018 PX1 || 
|- id="2001 QO253" bgcolor=#E9E9E9
| 0 ||  || MBA-M || 18.08 || data-sort-value="0.72" | 720 m || multiple || 2001–2021 || 10 May 2021 || 46 || align=left | Disc.: LINEARAlt.: 2014 WT277 || 
|- id="2001 QB262" bgcolor=#E9E9E9
| 0 ||  || MBA-M || 17.2 || 1.5 km || multiple || 2001–2020 || 19 Jan 2020 || 104 || align=left | Disc.: LINEAR || 
|- id="2001 QV264" bgcolor=#fefefe
| 0 ||  || MBA-I || 18.0 || data-sort-value="0.75" | 750 m || multiple || 2001–2021 || 18 Jan 2021 || 109 || align=left | Disc.: AMOSAlt.: 2005 VU38 || 
|- id="2001 QC265" bgcolor=#E9E9E9
| 0 ||  || MBA-M || 17.15 || 2.8 km || multiple || 2001–2021 || 01 Feb 2021 || 267 || align=left | Disc.: LINEAR || 
|- id="2001 QM268" bgcolor=#E9E9E9
| 2 ||  || MBA-M || 18.1 || 1.0 km || multiple || 2001–2014 || 20 Nov 2014 || 69 || align=left | Disc.: NEAT || 
|- id="2001 QR269" bgcolor=#fefefe
| 0 ||  || MBA-I || 18.4 || data-sort-value="0.62" | 620 m || multiple || 2001–2021 || 18 Jan 2021 || 64 || align=left | Disc.: Pic du Midi || 
|- id="2001 QZ269" bgcolor=#E9E9E9
| 0 ||  || MBA-M || 16.69 || 1.4 km || multiple || 1997–2021 || 08 Aug 2021 || 213 || align=left | Disc.: LINEARAlt.: 2016 EW6 || 
|- id="2001 QY271" bgcolor=#fefefe
| 0 ||  || MBA-I || 17.39 || data-sort-value="0.99" | 990 m || multiple || 2001–2021 || 06 Apr 2021 || 247 || align=left | Disc.: LINEARAlt.: 2007 ET125, 2012 UH74 || 
|- id="2001 QT273" bgcolor=#E9E9E9
| 1 ||  || MBA-M || 16.9 || 1.8 km || multiple || 2001–2018 || 24 Jun 2018 || 63 || align=left | Disc.: LINEARAlt.: 2014 LN25 || 
|- id="2001 QF275" bgcolor=#E9E9E9
| 0 ||  || MBA-M || 16.9 || 2.3 km || multiple || 1996–2021 || 18 Jan 2021 || 143 || align=left | Disc.: LINEAR || 
|- id="2001 QW276" bgcolor=#E9E9E9
| 0 ||  || MBA-M || 17.5 || data-sort-value="0.94" | 940 m || multiple || 2001–2021 || 11 Jun 2021 || 159 || align=left | Disc.: LINEAR || 
|- id="2001 QL278" bgcolor=#E9E9E9
| 0 ||  || MBA-M || 17.5 || 1.3 km || multiple || 2001–2018 || 04 Nov 2018 || 90 || align=left | Disc.: LINEARAlt.: 2010 VN78, 2013 JX76 || 
|- id="2001 QG279" bgcolor=#fefefe
| 0 ||  || MBA-I || 18.0 || data-sort-value="0.75" | 750 m || multiple || 2001–2019 || 29 Nov 2019 || 90 || align=left | Disc.: LINEAR || 
|- id="2001 QJ279" bgcolor=#fefefe
| 0 ||  || MBA-I || 17.3 || 1.0 km || multiple || 2001–2021 || 13 Jan 2021 || 152 || align=left | Disc.: LINEAR || 
|- id="2001 QP281" bgcolor=#d6d6d6
| 0 ||  || MBA-O || 15.76 || 3.9 km || multiple || 2001–2021 || 18 Apr 2021 || 154 || align=left | Disc.: LINEAR || 
|- id="2001 QY282" bgcolor=#d6d6d6
| 0 ||  || MBA-O || 16.93 || 2.3 km || multiple || 2001–2021 || 07 Jul 2021 || 180 || align=left | Disc.: Kvistaberg Obs. || 
|- id="2001 QR286" bgcolor=#d6d6d6
| 0 ||  || MBA-O || 16.5 || 2.8 km || multiple || 2001–2021 || 08 Jun 2021 || 109 || align=left | Disc.: NEAT || 
|- id="2001 QS286" bgcolor=#d6d6d6
| 1 ||  || MBA-O || 16.2 || 3.2 km || multiple || 2001–2018 || 09 Nov 2018 || 56 || align=left | Disc.: NEAT || 
|- id="2001 QG288" bgcolor=#d6d6d6
| 0 ||  || MBA-O || 16.2 || 3.2 km || multiple || 2001–2018 || 13 Dec 2018 || 64 || align=left | Disc.: NEAT || 
|- id="2001 QS290" bgcolor=#fefefe
| – ||  || MBA-I || 18.5 || data-sort-value="0.59" | 590 m || single || 12 days || 28 Aug 2001 || 9 || align=left | Disc.: LINEAR || 
|- id="2001 QO297" bgcolor=#C2E0FF
| 3 ||  || TNO || 6.61 || 158 km || multiple || 2000–2020 || 13 Sep 2020 || 115 || align=left | Disc.: Cerro TololoLoUTNOs, cubewano (cold) || 
|- id="2001 QP297" bgcolor=#C2E0FF
| 3 ||  || TNO || 6.84 || 142 km || multiple || 2001–2018 || 26 Nov 2018 || 61 || align=left | Disc.: Cerro TololoLoUTNOs, cubewano (cold) || 
|- id="2001 QQ297" bgcolor=#C2E0FF
| 3 ||  || TNO || 7.0 || 132 km || multiple || 2001–2013 || 05 Oct 2013 || 18 || align=left | Disc.: Cerro TololoLoUTNOs, cubewano (cold) || 
|- id="2001 QR297" bgcolor=#C2E0FF
| 3 ||  || TNO || 6.73 || 231 km || multiple || 2001–2021 || 08 Aug 2021 || 84 || align=left | Disc.: Cerro TololoLoUTNOs, cubewano (hot) || 
|- id="2001 QS297" bgcolor=#C2E0FF
| E ||  || TNO || 5.4 || 285 km || single || 23 days || 12 Sep 2001 || 6 || align=left | Disc.: Cerro TololoLoUTNOs, cubewano? || 
|- id="2001 QU297" bgcolor=#C2E0FF
| E ||  || TNO || 6.0 || 217 km || single || 23 days || 12 Sep 2001 || 6 || align=left | Disc.: Cerro TololoLoUTNOs, cubewano? || 
|- id="2001 QV297" bgcolor=#C2E0FF
| E ||  || TNO || 6.3 || 189 km || single || 1 day || 21 Aug 2001 || 4 || align=left | Disc.: Cerro TololoLoUTNOs, cubewano? || 
|- id="2001 QX297" bgcolor=#C2E0FF
| 3 ||  || TNO || 6.3 || 183 km || multiple || 2000–2009 || 20 Nov 2009 || 31 || align=left | Disc.: Cerro TololoLoUTNOs, cubewano (cold) || 
|- id="2001 QZ297" bgcolor=#C2E0FF
| 3 ||  || TNO || 6.9 || 139 km || multiple || 2000–2019 || 04 Sep 2019 || 30 || align=left | Disc.: Cerro TololoLoUTNOs, cubewano (cold) || 
|- id="2001 QA298" bgcolor=#C2E0FF
| 2 ||  || TNO || 7.6 || 126 km || multiple || 2000–2014 || 19 Sep 2014 || 25 || align=left | Disc.: Cerro TololoLoUTNOs, other TNO || 
|- id="2001 QC298" bgcolor=#C2E0FF
| 1 ||  || TNO || 6.8 || 235 km || multiple || 2000–2020 || 12 Aug 2020 || 74 || align=left | Disc.: Cerro TololoLoUTNOs, other TNO, albedo: 0.063; BR-mag: 1.03; taxonomy: BR; binary: 192 km || 
|- id="2001 QE298" bgcolor=#C2E0FF
| 2 ||  || TNO || 7.68 || 105 km || multiple || 2001–2017 || 19 Nov 2017 || 114 || align=left | Disc.: Cerro TololoLoUTNOs, res4:7, BR-mag: 1.89; taxonomy: RR || 
|- id="2001 QH298" bgcolor=#C2E0FF
| 3 ||  || TNO || 8.08 || 114 km || multiple || 2000–2017 || 22 Aug 2017 || 24 || align=left | Disc.: Cerro TololoLoUTNOs, plutino || 
|- id="2001 QU298" bgcolor=#E9E9E9
| 0 ||  || MBA-M || 18.15 || data-sort-value="0.99" | 990 m || multiple || 2001–2021 || 18 Jan 2021 || 36 || align=left | Disc.: Cerro TololoAdded on 22 July 2020Alt.: 2015 VG184 || 
|- id="2001 QZ298" bgcolor=#fefefe
| 3 ||  || MBA-I || 19.1 || data-sort-value="0.45" | 450 m || multiple || 2001–2020 || 14 Feb 2020 || 26 || align=left | Disc.: Cerro TololoAdded on 22 July 2020 || 
|- id="2001 QJ299" bgcolor=#fefefe
| 0 ||  || MBA-I || 18.6 || data-sort-value="0.57" | 570 m || multiple || 2001–2021 || 14 Apr 2021 || 46 || align=left | Disc.: Cerro TololoAdded on 11 May 2021Alt.: 2014 EZ213 || 
|- id="2001 QU299" bgcolor=#fefefe
| 1 ||  || MBA-I || 18.74 || data-sort-value="0.53" | 530 m || multiple || 2001–2021 || 30 Nov 2021 || 95 || align=left | Disc.: Cerro TololoAdded on 22 July 2020 || 
|- id="2001 QA300" bgcolor=#E9E9E9
| 0 ||  || MBA-M || 17.9 || 1.5 km || multiple || 2001–2020 || 14 Sep 2020 || 49 || align=left | Disc.: Cerro TololoAdded on 21 August 2021Alt.: 2006 QU74 || 
|- id="2001 QG300" bgcolor=#fefefe
| 0 ||  || MBA-I || 19.0 || data-sort-value="0.47" | 470 m || multiple || 2001–2020 || 01 Feb 2020 || 25 || align=left | Disc.: Cerro TololoAdded on 30 September 2021Alt.: 2015 SW49 || 
|- id="2001 QV300" bgcolor=#d6d6d6
| 0 ||  || MBA-O || 17.5 || 1.8 km || multiple || 2001–2021 || 04 Oct 2021 || 33 || align=left | Disc.: Cerro Tololo Obs.Added on 29 January 2022 || 
|- id="2001 QY300" bgcolor=#fefefe
| 0 ||  || MBA-I || 19.0 || data-sort-value="0.47" | 470 m || multiple || 2001–2020 || 12 Sep 2020 || 44 || align=left | Disc.: Cerro Tololo || 
|- id="2001 QL301" bgcolor=#d6d6d6
| 0 ||  || MBA-O || 17.88 || 1.5 km || multiple || 2001–2021 || 10 May 2021 || 32 || align=left | Disc.: Cerro Tololo || 
|- id="2001 QP301" bgcolor=#d6d6d6
| – ||  || MBA-O || 16.5 || 2.8 km || single || 32 days || 20 Aug 2001 || 7 || align=left | Disc.: Cerro Tololo || 
|- id="2001 QX301" bgcolor=#fefefe
| 0 ||  || MBA-I || 18.8 || data-sort-value="0.52" | 520 m || multiple || 2001–2021 || 10 Apr 2021 || 34 || align=left | Disc.: Cerro TololoAdded on 17 June 2021 || 
|- id="2001 QD302" bgcolor=#d6d6d6
| 0 ||  || MBA-O || 17.7 || 1.6 km || multiple || 2001–2021 || 09 May 2021 || 97 || align=left | Disc.: Cerro TololoAlt.: 2010 GV60, 2021 CK21 || 
|- id="2001 QG302" bgcolor=#fefefe
| – ||  || MBA-I || 19.3 || data-sort-value="0.41" | 410 m || single || 2 days || 21 Aug 2001 || 6 || align=left | Disc.: Cerro Tololo || 
|- id="2001 QS302" bgcolor=#E9E9E9
| 0 ||  || MBA-M || 17.2 || 2.0 km || multiple || 2001–2019 || 25 Sep 2019 || 53 || align=left | Disc.: Cerro Tololo || 
|- id="2001 QW302" bgcolor=#fefefe
| 3 ||  || MBA-I || 19.3 || data-sort-value="0.41" | 410 m || multiple || 2001–2020 || 16 Dec 2020 || 29 || align=left | Disc.: Cerro TololoAdded on 21 August 2021Alt.: 2020 XS18 || 
|- id="2001 QX302" bgcolor=#fefefe
| 0 ||  || MBA-I || 18.10 || data-sort-value="0.71" | 710 m || multiple || 2001–2020 || 18 Jul 2020 || 33 || align=left | Disc.: Cerro TololoAdded on 21 August 2021Alt.: 2015 BJ387 || 
|- id="2001 QC303" bgcolor=#d6d6d6
| 0 ||  || MBA-O || 17.09 || 2.1 km || multiple || 2001–2021 || 10 May 2021 || 60 || align=left | Disc.: Cerro Tololo || 
|- id="2001 QF303" bgcolor=#fefefe
| – ||  || MBA-I || 18.5 || data-sort-value="0.59" | 590 m || single || 2 days || 21 Aug 2001 || 6 || align=left | Disc.: Cerro Tololo || 
|- id="2001 QG303" bgcolor=#fefefe
| – ||  || MBA-I || 20.0 || data-sort-value="0.30" | 300 m || single || 2 days || 21 Aug 2001 || 6 || align=left | Disc.: Cerro Tololo || 
|- id="2001 QL303" bgcolor=#fefefe
| – ||  || MBA-I || 18.3 || data-sort-value="0.65" | 650 m || single || 2 days || 21 Aug 2001 || 6 || align=left | Disc.: Cerro Tololo || 
|- id="2001 QY303" bgcolor=#E9E9E9
| 0 ||  || MBA-M || 17.89 || data-sort-value="0.79" | 790 m || multiple || 2001–2021 || 07 May 2021 || 56 || align=left | Disc.: Cerro Tololo || 
|- id="2001 QB304" bgcolor=#E9E9E9
| 0 ||  || MBA-M || 18.1 || 1.0 km || multiple || 2001–2020 || 27 Jan 2020 || 39 || align=left | Disc.: Cerro TololoAdded on 22 July 2020Alt.: 2016 CC92 || 
|- id="2001 QM304" bgcolor=#d6d6d6
| 2 ||  || MBA-O || 16.8 || 2.4 km || multiple || 2001–2019 || 25 Oct 2019 || 24 || align=left | Disc.: Cerro TololoAdded on 22 July 2020 || 
|- id="2001 QT304" bgcolor=#d6d6d6
| 1 ||  || MBA-O || 16.7 || 2.5 km || multiple || 2001–2018 || 30 Sep 2018 || 44 || align=left | Disc.: Cerro Tololo || 
|- id="2001 QX304" bgcolor=#d6d6d6
| 0 ||  || MBA-O || 16.91 || 2.3 km || multiple || 2001–2021 || 07 Jul 2021 || 61 || align=left | Disc.: Cerro TololoAdded on 11 May 2021Alt.: 2015 FR306 || 
|- id="2001 QA305" bgcolor=#fefefe
| 0 ||  || MBA-I || 18.21 || data-sort-value="0.68" | 680 m || multiple || 2001–2022 || 26 Jan 2022 || 60 || align=left | Disc.: Cerro Tololo || 
|- id="2001 QB306" bgcolor=#E9E9E9
| 0 ||  || MBA-M || 18.0 || data-sort-value="0.75" | 750 m || multiple || 2001–2020 || 12 Apr 2020 || 37 || align=left | Disc.: Cerro Tololo || 
|- id="2001 QE306" bgcolor=#fefefe
| – ||  || MBA-I || 18.7 || data-sort-value="0.54" | 540 m || single || 2 days || 21 Aug 2001 || 6 || align=left | Disc.: Cerro Tololo || 
|- id="2001 QF306" bgcolor=#E9E9E9
| 0 ||  || MBA-M || 17.5 || 1.8 km || multiple || 2001–2020 || 10 Dec 2020 || 48 || align=left | Disc.: Cerro Tololo || 
|- id="2001 QJ306" bgcolor=#fefefe
| 1 ||  || MBA-I || 19.6 || data-sort-value="0.36" | 360 m || multiple || 2001–2019 || 23 Oct 2019 || 25 || align=left | Disc.: Cerro Tololo || 
|- id="2001 QL306" bgcolor=#E9E9E9
| – ||  || MBA-M || 18.8 || data-sort-value="0.73" | 730 m || single || 2 days || 21 Aug 2001 || 6 || align=left | Disc.: Cerro Tololo || 
|- id="2001 QM306" bgcolor=#fefefe
| 1 ||  || MBA-I || 19.1 || data-sort-value="0.45" | 450 m || multiple || 2001–2020 || 20 Oct 2020 || 88 || align=left | Disc.: Cerro TololoAdded on 22 July 2020Alt.: 2014 WF566 || 
|- id="2001 QS306" bgcolor=#d6d6d6
| 6 ||  || MBA-O || 16.9 || 2.3 km || multiple || 2001–2021 || 06 Feb 2021 || 10 || align=left | Disc.: Cerro Tololo || 
|- id="2001 QV306" bgcolor=#d6d6d6
| 0 ||  || MBA-O || 17.52 || 1.7 km || multiple || 2001–2021 || 12 Nov 2021 || 71 || align=left | Disc.: Cerro Tololo || 
|- id="2001 QA307" bgcolor=#d6d6d6
| – ||  || MBA-O || 17.6 || 1.7 km || single || 2 days || 21 Aug 2001 || 6 || align=left | Disc.: Cerro Tololo || 
|- id="2001 QE307" bgcolor=#fefefe
| 0 ||  || MBA-I || 18.4 || data-sort-value="0.62" | 620 m || multiple || 2001–2020 || 05 Nov 2020 || 58 || align=left | Disc.: Cerro TololoAdded on 17 January 2021Alt.: 2020 TZ14 || 
|- id="2001 QG307" bgcolor=#E9E9E9
| – ||  || MBA-M || 17.9 || 1.5 km || single || 2 days || 21 Aug 2001 || 6 || align=left | Disc.: Cerro Tololo || 
|- id="2001 QJ307" bgcolor=#fefefe
| 0 ||  || MBA-I || 18.3 || data-sort-value="0.65" | 650 m || multiple || 2001–2020 || 10 Dec 2020 || 44 || align=left | Disc.: Cerro TololoAdded on 22 July 2020 || 
|- id="2001 QK307" bgcolor=#d6d6d6
| 4 ||  || MBA-O || 17.9 || 1.5 km || multiple || 2001-2020 || 16 Aug 2020 || 57 || align=left | Disc.: Cerro TololoAlt.: 2016 UY223, 2020 PL91 || 
|- id="2001 QM307" bgcolor=#E9E9E9
| 0 ||  || MBA-M || 17.7 || 1.6 km || multiple || 2000–2019 || 28 Aug 2019 || 170 || align=left | Disc.: Cerro Tololo || 
|- id="2001 QO307" bgcolor=#d6d6d6
| 0 ||  || MBA-O || 17.91 || 1.5 km || multiple || 2001-2021 || 29 Nov 2021 || 50 || align=left | Disc.: Cerro TololoAlt.: 2014 HU261 || 
|- id="2001 QR307" bgcolor=#d6d6d6
| 0 ||  || MBA-O || 16.9 || 2.3 km || multiple || 2001–2021 || 08 Apr 2021 || 77 || align=left | Disc.: Cerro TololoAdded on 22 July 2020Alt.: 2005 EP285 || 
|- id="2001 QS307" bgcolor=#d6d6d6
| – ||  || MBA-O || 16.6 || 2.7 km || single || 2 days || 21 Aug 2001 || 6 || align=left | Disc.: Cerro Tololo || 
|- id="2001 QU307" bgcolor=#d6d6d6
| E ||  || MBA-O || 17.2 || 2.0 km || single || 2 days || 21 Aug 2001 || 6 || align=left | Disc.: Cerro Tololo || 
|- id="2001 QJ308" bgcolor=#d6d6d6
| E ||  || MBA-O || 18.0 || 1.4 km || single || 2 days || 21 Aug 2001 || 6 || align=left | Disc.: Cerro Tololo || 
|- id="2001 QN308" bgcolor=#d6d6d6
| 0 ||  || MBA-O || 16.2 || 3.2 km || multiple || 2001–2021 || 07 Feb 2021 || 94 || align=left | Disc.: Cerro TololoAdded on 11 May 2021Alt.: 2015 BY558 || 
|- id="2001 QP308" bgcolor=#fefefe
| 2 ||  || MBA-I || 19.4 || data-sort-value="0.39" | 390 m || multiple || 2001–2019 || 24 Oct 2019 || 22 || align=left | Disc.: Cerro Tololo || 
|- id="2001 QV308" bgcolor=#fefefe
| 0 ||  || MBA-I || 18.5 || data-sort-value="0.59" | 590 m || multiple || 2001–2020 || 15 Oct 2020 || 35 || align=left | Disc.: Cerro TololoAdded on 17 January 2021 || 
|- id="2001 QW308" bgcolor=#fefefe
| 0 ||  || MBA-I || 17.5 || data-sort-value="0.94" | 940 m || multiple || 2001–2019 || 22 Sep 2019 || 61 || align=left | Disc.: Cerro Tololo || 
|- id="2001 QA309" bgcolor=#fefefe
| 2 ||  || MBA-I || 19.4 || data-sort-value="0.39" | 390 m || multiple || 2001–2019 || 28 Aug 2019 || 21 || align=left | Disc.: Cerro TololoAdded on 21 August 2021Alt.: 2019 PU64 || 
|- id="2001 QG309" bgcolor=#d6d6d6
| 0 ||  || MBA-O || 16.7 || 2.5 km || multiple || 2001–2020 || 21 Apr 2020 || 43 || align=left | Disc.: Cerro TololoAdded on 21 August 2021Alt.: 2007 VC83 || 
|- id="2001 QO309" bgcolor=#E9E9E9
| 0 ||  || MBA-M || 17.9 || 1.1 km || multiple || 2001–2018 || 11 Aug 2018 || 31 || align=left | Disc.: Cerro TololoAdded on 22 July 2020 || 
|- id="2001 QQ309" bgcolor=#E9E9E9
| 0 ||  || MBA-M || 17.4 || 1.8 km || multiple || 2001–2020 || 24 Nov 2020 || 31 || align=left | Disc.: Cerro TololoAdded on 17 January 2021 || 
|- id="2001 QT309" bgcolor=#d6d6d6
| 0 ||  || MBA-O || 17.12 || 2.1 km || multiple || 1996–2021 || 05 Aug 2021 || 72 || align=left | Disc.: Cerro Tololo || 
|- id="2001 QK310" bgcolor=#E9E9E9
| 0 ||  || MBA-M || 18.2 || data-sort-value="0.86" | 780 m || multiple || 2001-2022 || 29 Nov 2022 || 78 || align=left | Disc.: Cerro TololoAlt.: 2011 AE106 || 
|- id="2001 QN310" bgcolor=#E9E9E9
| 0 ||  || MBA-M || 18.3 || data-sort-value="0.92" | 920 m || multiple || 2001–2020 || 02 Feb 2020 || 56 || align=left | Disc.: Cerro Tololo || 
|- id="2001 QO310" bgcolor=#E9E9E9
| 0 ||  || MBA-M || 18.0 || 1.1 km || multiple || 2001–2019 || 02 Nov 2019 || 53 || align=left | Disc.: Cerro TololoAdded on 22 July 2020Alt.: 2013 HZ112 || 
|- id="2001 QZ310" bgcolor=#d6d6d6
| 0 ||  || MBA-O || 17.24 || 2.0 km || multiple || 2001–2021 || 15 Apr 2021 || 50 || align=left | Disc.: Cerro TololoAlt.: 2007 VY22, 2015 DK21 || 
|- id="2001 QA311" bgcolor=#fefefe
| 0 ||  || MBA-I || 18.75 || data-sort-value="0.53" | 530 m || multiple || 2001–2021 || 11 Oct 2021 || 45 || align=left | Disc.: Cerro TololoAlt.: 2016 GC288 || 
|- id="2001 QB311" bgcolor=#fefefe
| 1 ||  || MBA-I || 18.66 || data-sort-value="0.55" | 550 m || multiple || 2001–2022 || 07 Jan 2022 || 51 || align=left | Disc.: Cerro Tololo || 
|- id="2001 QN311" bgcolor=#fefefe
| 0 ||  || MBA-I || 19.08 || data-sort-value="0.45" | 450 m || multiple || 2001–2021 || 29 Oct 2021 || 58 || align=left | Disc.: Cerro TololoAdded on 5 November 2021Alt.: 2021 PQ105 || 
|- id="2001 QS311" bgcolor=#d6d6d6
| 0 ||  || MBA-O || 16.71 || 2.7 km || multiple || 2001–2021 || 02 Apr 2021 || 152 || align=left | Disc.: Cerro TololoAlt.: 2010 KA66 || 
|- id="2001 QU311" bgcolor=#fefefe
| 0 ||  || MBA-I || 18.3 || data-sort-value="0.65" | 650 m || multiple || 2001–2020 || 15 Oct 2020 || 89 || align=left | Disc.: Cerro TololoAdded on 19 October 2020Alt.: 2005 SH145 || 
|- id="2001 QY311" bgcolor=#d6d6d6
| 0 ||  || MBA-O || 17.95 || 1.4 km || multiple || 2001–2021 || 08 Sep 2021 || 50 || align=left | Disc.: Cerro TololoAlt.: 2021 NY17 || 
|- id="2001 QB312" bgcolor=#d6d6d6
| 3 ||  || MBA-O || 17.2 || 2.0 km || multiple || 2001–2020 || 27 Jan 2020 || 25 || align=left | Disc.: Cerro TololoAdded on 22 July 2020 || 
|- id="2001 QV312" bgcolor=#E9E9E9
| 0 ||  || MBA-M || 17.90 || 1.5 km || multiple || 2001–2021 || 30 Nov 2021 || 61 || align=left | Disc.: Cerro TololoAdded on 22 July 2020 || 
|- id="2001 QX312" bgcolor=#d6d6d6
| 1 ||  || MBA-O || 17.2 || 2.0 km || multiple || 2001–2018 || 14 Aug 2018 || 22 || align=left | Disc.: Cerro Tololo || 
|- id="2001 QU313" bgcolor=#d6d6d6
| 6 ||  || MBA-O || 18.0 || 1.4 km || multiple || 2001–2016 || 13 Mar 2016 || 7 || align=left | Disc.: Cerro Tololo || 
|- id="2001 QX313" bgcolor=#fefefe
| 1 ||  || MBA-I || 18.9 || data-sort-value="0.49" | 490 m || multiple || 2001–2020 || 10 Dec 2020 || 50 || align=left | Disc.: Cerro Tololo || 
|- id="2001 QP314" bgcolor=#fefefe
| 1 ||  || MBA-I || 18.65 || data-sort-value="0.55" | 550 m || multiple || 2001–2021 || 14 Nov 2021 || 87 || align=left | Disc.: Cerro Tololo || 
|- id="2001 QL315" bgcolor=#E9E9E9
| 0 ||  || MBA-M || 18.13 || 1.3 km || multiple || 2001–2020 || 22 Oct 2020 || 79 || align=left | Disc.: Cerro TololoAdded on 9 March 2021 || 
|- id="2001 QZ315" bgcolor=#d6d6d6
| 3 ||  || MBA-O || 16.9 || 2.3 km || multiple || 2001–2019 || 28 Dec 2019 || 23 || align=left | Disc.: Cerro TololoAdded on 21 August 2021Alt.: 2015 BU268 || 
|- id="2001 QC316" bgcolor=#E9E9E9
| 1 ||  || MBA-M || 17.0 || 2.2 km || multiple || 2001–2020 || 11 Dec 2020 || 65 || align=left | Disc.: Cerro Tololo || 
|- id="2001 QU316" bgcolor=#d6d6d6
| 1 ||  || MBA-O || 17.37 || 1.9 km || multiple || 2001–2020 || 11 Apr 2020 || 29 || align=left | Disc.: Cerro TololoAdded on 11 May 2021Alt.: 2017 SN228 || 
|- id="2001 QB317" bgcolor=#d6d6d6
| 0 ||  || MBA-O || 16.8 || 2.4 km || multiple || 2001–2020 || 12 Dec 2020 || 38 || align=left | Disc.: Cerro TololoAdded on 21 August 2021Alt.: 2011 GV || 
|- id="2001 QO317" bgcolor=#E9E9E9
| 0 ||  || MBA-M || 17.8 || 1.5 km || multiple || 2001–2019 || 25 Sep 2019 || 38 || align=left | Disc.: Cerro TololoAdded on 21 August 2021Alt.: 2006 UZ205 || 
|- id="2001 QP317" bgcolor=#d6d6d6
| 1 ||  || MBA-O || 17.9 || 1.5 km || multiple || 2001–2020 || 26 Jan 2020 || 28 || align=left | Disc.: Cerro TololoAlt.: 2007 TQ284 || 
|- id="2001 QR317" bgcolor=#fefefe
| 0 ||  || MBA-I || 19.32 || data-sort-value="0.41" | 410 m || multiple || 2001–2021 || 08 Nov 2021 || 84 || align=left | Disc.: Cerro TololoAdded on 21 August 2021Alt.: 2005 YM67 || 
|- id="2001 QL318" bgcolor=#d6d6d6
| 2 ||  || MBA-O || 17.3 || 1.9 km || multiple || 2001–2019 || 03 Dec 2019 || 26 || align=left | Disc.: Cerro Tololo || 
|- id="2001 QY318" bgcolor=#d6d6d6
| 0 ||  || MBA-O || 16.91 || 2.3 km || multiple || 1999–2022 || 27 Jan 2022 || 48 || align=left | Disc.: Cerro Tololo || 
|- id="2001 QG319" bgcolor=#fefefe
| 0 ||  || MBA-I || 18.72 || data-sort-value="0.54" | 540 m || multiple || 2001–2021 || 30 Nov 2021 || 52 || align=left | Disc.: Cerro Tololo || 
|- id="2001 QJ319" bgcolor=#d6d6d6
| 0 ||  || MBA-O || 17.2 || 2.0 km || multiple || 2001–2021 || 07 Jun 2021 || 38 || align=left | Disc.: Cerro TololoAdded on 22 July 2020 || 
|- id="2001 QK319" bgcolor=#d6d6d6
| 0 ||  || MBA-O || 17.2 || 2.0 km || multiple || 1999–2020 || 11 Dec 2020 || 47 || align=left | Disc.: Cerro TololoAlt.: 2010 CP39 || 
|- id="2001 QP319" bgcolor=#d6d6d6
| 1 ||  || MBA-O || 16.8 || 2.4 km || multiple || 2001–2019 || 08 Oct 2019 || 23 || align=left | Disc.: Cerro TololoAdded on 22 July 2020 || 
|- id="2001 QT319" bgcolor=#d6d6d6
| – ||  || MBA-O || 17.8 || 1.5 km || single || 23 days || 12 Sep 2001 || 6 || align=left | Disc.: Cerro Tololo || 
|- id="2001 QY319" bgcolor=#d6d6d6
| – ||  || MBA-O || 18.1 || 1.3 km || single || 23 days || 12 Sep 2001 || 6 || align=left | Disc.: Cerro Tololo || 
|- id="2001 QC321" bgcolor=#d6d6d6
| 3 ||  || MBA-O || 17.61 || 1.7 km || multiple || 2001-2028 || 06 Oct 2018 || 24 || align=left | Disc.: Cerro Tololo || 
|- id="2001 QG321" bgcolor=#E9E9E9
| 0 ||  || MBA-M || 18.55 || data-sort-value="0.58" | 580 m || multiple || 2001–2021 || 08 Aug 2021 || 41 || align=left | Disc.: Cerro TololoAdded on 19 October 2020 || 
|- id="2001 QP321" bgcolor=#fefefe
| 1 ||  || MBA-I || 18.56 || data-sort-value="0.58" | 580 m || multiple || 2001–2021 || 08 Apr 2021 || 53 || align=left | Disc.: Cerro TololoAdded on 11 May 2021Alt.: 2014 GA20 || 
|- id="2001 QQ321" bgcolor=#fefefe
| 0 ||  || MBA-I || 18.4 || data-sort-value="0.62" | 620 m || multiple || 2001–2016 || 08 Jun 2016 || 37 || align=left | Disc.: Cerro TololoAdded on 22 July 2020 || 
|- id="2001 QV321" bgcolor=#E9E9E9
| E ||  || MBA-M || 18.3 || 1.2 km || single || 2 days || 21 Aug 2001 || 6 || align=left | Disc.: Cerro Tololo || 
|- id="2001 QA322" bgcolor=#fefefe
| – ||  || MBA-I || 19.5 || data-sort-value="0.37" | 370 m || single || 2 days || 21 Aug 2001 || 6 || align=left | Disc.: Cerro Tololo || 
|- id="2001 QB322" bgcolor=#FA8072
| 0 ||  || MCA || 18.4 || data-sort-value="0.62" | 620 m || multiple || 2001–2019 || 28 Nov 2019 || 84 || align=left | Disc.: Cerro TololoAlt.: 2017 EW9 || 
|- id="2001 QD322" bgcolor=#fefefe
| 0 ||  || MBA-I || 18.7 || data-sort-value="0.54" | 540 m || multiple || 2001–2020 || 11 Nov 2020 || 29 || align=left | Disc.: Cerro Tololo || 
|- id="2001 QG322" bgcolor=#E9E9E9
| 0 ||  || MBA-M || 18.13 || data-sort-value="0.99" | 990 m || multiple || 2001–2021 || 31 May 2021 || 63 || align=left | Disc.: Cerro Tololo || 
|- id="2001 QQ322" bgcolor=#C2E0FF
| 3 ||  || TNO || 6.56 || 120 km || multiple || 2000–2020 || 21 Sep 2020 || 112 || align=left | Disc.: Cerro TololoLoUTNOs, cubewano (cold), binary: 109 km || 
|- id="2001 QR322" bgcolor=#C2E0FF
| 2 ||  || TNO || 8.12 || 132 km || multiple || 2001–2020 || 09 Dec 2020 || 99 || align=left | Disc.: Cerro TololoLoUTNOs, NT, albedo: 0.058 || 
|- id="2001 QS322" bgcolor=#C2E0FF
| 2 ||  || TNO || 6.96 || 186 km || multiple || 2001–2018 || 26 Nov 2018 || 72 || align=left | Disc.: Cerro TololoLoUTNOs, cubewano (cold), albedo: 0.095 || 
|- id="2001 QW322" bgcolor=#C2E0FF
| 4 ||  || TNO || 7.9 || 128 km || multiple || 2001–2019 || 04 Sep 2019 || 55 || align=left | Disc.: Mauna Kea Obs.LoUTNOs, cubewano (cold), albedo: 0.093; binary: 126 km || 
|- id="2001 QX322" bgcolor=#C2E0FF
| 2 ||  || TNO || 6.49 || 190 km || multiple || 2001–2021 || 01 Dec 2021 || 89 || align=left | Disc.: La Palma Obs.LoUTNOs, SDO, BR-mag: 1.46; taxonomy: IR || 
|- id="2001 QB326" bgcolor=#d6d6d6
| 0 ||  || MBA-O || 17.16 || 2.1 km || multiple || 2001–2021 || 15 Apr 2021 || 64 || align=left | Disc.: Cerro TololoAdded on 22 July 2020 || 
|- id="2001 QM326" bgcolor=#fefefe
| 1 ||  || MBA-I || 19.2 || data-sort-value="0.43" | 430 m || multiple || 2001–2020 || 16 Aug 2020 || 33 || align=left | Disc.: Cerro TololoAdded on 21 August 2021Alt.: 2017 RN127 || 
|- id="2001 QO326" bgcolor=#d6d6d6
| E ||  || HIL || 16.1 || 3.4 km || single || 2 days || 21 Aug 2001 || 6 || align=left | Disc.: Cerro Tololo || 
|- id="2001 QH327" bgcolor=#E9E9E9
| 0 ||  || MBA-M || 16.5 || 2.1 km || multiple || 2001–2021 || 18 Jan 2021 || 234 || align=left | Disc.: AMOSAlt.: 2008 AP130, 2014 KG94 || 
|- id="2001 QU327" bgcolor=#d6d6d6
| 0 ||  || MBA-O || 16.2 || 3.2 km || multiple || 1984–2019 || 03 Dec 2019 || 145 || align=left | Disc.: NEAT || 
|- id="2001 QK328" bgcolor=#fefefe
| 0 ||  || MBA-I || 18.34 || data-sort-value="0.64" | 640 m || multiple || 2001–2020 || 18 Dec 2020 || 110 || align=left | Disc.: NEAT || 
|- id="2001 QZ328" bgcolor=#E9E9E9
| 0 ||  || MBA-M || 18.07 || data-sort-value="0.62" | 900 m || multiple || 2001-2022 || 30 Nov 2022 || 87 || align=left | Disc.: LINEARAlt.: 2013 KD22 || 
|- id="2001 QN329" bgcolor=#E9E9E9
| 1 ||  || MBA-M || 17.7 || 1.2 km || multiple || 2001–2020 || 23 Jan 2020 || 99 || align=left | Disc.: LONEOSAlt.: 2014 QX18 || 
|- id="2001 QW329" bgcolor=#fefefe
| 1 ||  || MBA-I || 17.9 || data-sort-value="0.78" | 780 m || multiple || 2001–2019 || 31 Oct 2019 || 113 || align=left | Disc.: LONEOSAlt.: 2012 TM256 || 
|- id="2001 QP331" bgcolor=#C2FFFF
| D ||  || JT || 14.8 || 6.1 km || single || 6 days || 25 Aug 2001 || 21 || align=left | Disc.: La Palma Obs.Trojan camp (L5)Alt.: 2001 QQ331 || 
|- id="2001 QR331" bgcolor=#E9E9E9
| – ||  || MBA-M || 18.7 || data-sort-value="0.76" | 760 m || single || 7 days || 26 Aug 2001 || 21 || align=left | Disc.: La Palma Obs. || 
|- id="2001 QS331" bgcolor=#C2FFFF
| – ||  || JT || 15.2 || 5.1 km || single || 6 days || 25 Aug 2001 || 17 || align=left | Disc.: La Palma Obs.Trojan camp (L5) || 
|- id="2001 QT331" bgcolor=#fefefe
| 1 ||  || HUN || 19.1 || data-sort-value="0.45" | 450 m || multiple || 2001–2020 || 13 Nov 2020 || 39 || align=left | Disc.: La Palma Obs.Added on 17 January 2021 || 
|- id="2001 QU331" bgcolor=#C2FFFF
| – ||  || JT || 15.4 || 4.6 km || single || 3 days || 26 Aug 2001 || 9 || align=left | Disc.: La Palma Obs.Trojan camp (L5) || 
|- id="2001 QV331" bgcolor=#E9E9E9
| 0 ||  || MBA-M || 17.52 || data-sort-value="0.93" | 930 m || multiple || 2001–2021 || 30 Jun 2021 || 63 || align=left | Disc.: La Palma Obs. || 
|- id="2001 QX331" bgcolor=#d6d6d6
| – ||  || MBA-O || 18.7 || 1.0 km || single || 2 days || 26 Aug 2001 || 12 || align=left | Disc.: La Palma Obs. || 
|- id="2001 QZ331" bgcolor=#d6d6d6
| 3 ||  || MBA-O || 17.6 || 1.7 km || multiple || 2001–2017 || 12 Nov 2017 || 30 || align=left | Disc.: La Palma Obs. || 
|- id="2001 QL332" bgcolor=#E9E9E9
| 0 ||  || MBA-M || 17.3 || 1.9 km || multiple || 2001–2020 || 23 Jan 2020 || 75 || align=left | Disc.: NEATAlt.: 2015 XS126 || 
|- id="2001 QP332" bgcolor=#fefefe
| 0 ||  || MBA-I || 18.8 || data-sort-value="0.52" | 520 m || multiple || 2001–2019 || 25 Sep 2019 || 74 || align=left | Disc.: SpacewatchAlt.: 2012 UT160 || 
|- id="2001 QB334" bgcolor=#d6d6d6
| 0 ||  || MBA-O || 17.03 || 2.2 km || multiple || 2001–2021 || 07 Apr 2021 || 66 || align=left | Disc.: SpacewatchAlt.: 2008 YC148 || 
|- id="2001 QY334" bgcolor=#E9E9E9
| 0 ||  || MBA-M || 17.4 || 1.4 km || multiple || 2001–2020 || 27 Feb 2020 || 124 || align=left | Disc.: NEATAlt.: 2010 YJ5 || 
|- id="2001 QL335" bgcolor=#fefefe
| 0 ||  || MBA-I || 18.7 || data-sort-value="0.54" | 540 m || multiple || 2001–2020 || 10 Nov 2020 || 25 || align=left | Disc.: NEATAdded on 17 January 2021 || 
|- id="2001 QN335" bgcolor=#E9E9E9
| 0 ||  || MBA-M || 17.3 || 1.0 km || multiple || 2001–2020 || 22 Apr 2020 || 123 || align=left | Disc.: NEATAlt.: 2015 BZ307 || 
|- id="2001 QQ335" bgcolor=#fefefe
| 1 ||  || HUN || 18.1 || data-sort-value="0.71" | 710 m || multiple || 2001–2021 || 06 Jan 2021 || 113 || align=left | Disc.: Spacewatch || 
|- id="2001 QR335" bgcolor=#fefefe
| 0 ||  || MBA-I || 17.7 || data-sort-value="0.86" | 860 m || multiple || 2001–2020 || 23 Jan 2020 || 95 || align=left | Disc.: Cerro Tololo || 
|- id="2001 QT335" bgcolor=#d6d6d6
| 0 ||  || MBA-O || 17.00 || 2.2 km || multiple || 2001–2021 || 08 Aug 2021 || 90 || align=left | Disc.: Spacewatch || 
|- id="2001 QU335" bgcolor=#E9E9E9
| 0 ||  || MBA-M || 17.25 || 1.5 km || multiple || 2001–2021 || 16 Apr 2021 || 116 || align=left | Disc.: LONEOS || 
|- id="2001 QX335" bgcolor=#d6d6d6
| 0 ||  || MBA-O || 15.3 || 4.8 km || multiple || 2001–2021 || 22 Jan 2021 || 185 || align=left | Disc.: LONEOS || 
|- id="2001 QA336" bgcolor=#E9E9E9
| 0 ||  || MBA-M || 17.77 || data-sort-value="0.83" | 830 m || multiple || 2001–2021 || 10 Aug 2021 || 87 || align=left | Disc.: Cerro Tololo || 
|- id="2001 QB336" bgcolor=#fefefe
| 0 ||  || MBA-I || 18.1 || data-sort-value="0.71" | 710 m || multiple || 2001–2020 || 19 Nov 2020 || 83 || align=left | Disc.: Spacewatch || 
|- id="2001 QC336" bgcolor=#E9E9E9
| 0 ||  || MBA-M || 16.8 || 1.8 km || multiple || 2001–2021 || 18 Jan 2021 || 141 || align=left | Disc.: LONEOSAlt.: 2010 NM82 || 
|- id="2001 QD336" bgcolor=#fefefe
| 0 ||  || MBA-I || 18.1 || data-sort-value="0.71" | 710 m || multiple || 2001–2017 || 08 Dec 2017 || 59 || align=left | Disc.: Spacewatch || 
|- id="2001 QE336" bgcolor=#fefefe
| 0 ||  || MBA-I || 17.63 || data-sort-value="0.89" | 890 m || multiple || 2001–2021 || 10 Jun 2021 || 88 || align=left | Disc.: NEAT || 
|- id="2001 QF336" bgcolor=#fefefe
| 0 ||  || MBA-I || 18.2 || data-sort-value="0.68" | 680 m || multiple || 2001–2017 || 24 Dec 2017 || 57 || align=left | Disc.: Spacewatch || 
|- id="2001 QG336" bgcolor=#fefefe
| 0 ||  || MBA-I || 17.8 || data-sort-value="0.82" | 820 m || multiple || 2001–2020 || 08 Dec 2020 || 98 || align=left | Disc.: Spacewatch || 
|- id="2001 QJ336" bgcolor=#fefefe
| 0 ||  || MBA-I || 18.38 || data-sort-value="0.63" | 630 m || multiple || 2001–2019 || 06 Sep 2019 || 88 || align=left | Disc.: Cerro Tololo || 
|- id="2001 QK336" bgcolor=#E9E9E9
| 0 ||  || MBA-M || 16.5 || 2.8 km || multiple || 2001–2021 || 05 Jan 2021 || 84 || align=left | Disc.: Cerro Tololo || 
|- id="2001 QM336" bgcolor=#d6d6d6
| 0 ||  || MBA-O || 16.3 || 3.1 km || multiple || 2001–2021 || 17 Jan 2021 || 90 || align=left | Disc.: Siding Spring Obs. || 
|- id="2001 QN336" bgcolor=#fefefe
| 0 ||  || MBA-I || 18.4 || data-sort-value="0.62" | 620 m || multiple || 2001–2019 || 02 Jul 2019 || 60 || align=left | Disc.: Spacewatch || 
|- id="2001 QO336" bgcolor=#fefefe
| 0 ||  || MBA-I || 18.22 || data-sort-value="0.67" | 670 m || multiple || 2001–2021 || 13 May 2021 || 127 || align=left | Disc.: Cerro Tololo || 
|- id="2001 QP336" bgcolor=#E9E9E9
| 0 ||  || MBA-M || 17.09 || 1.6 km || multiple || 2001–2021 || 16 Apr 2021 || 55 || align=left | Disc.: NEAT || 
|- id="2001 QR336" bgcolor=#E9E9E9
| 0 ||  || MBA-M || 18.0 || 1.1 km || multiple || 1997–2020 || 05 Jan 2020 || 55 || align=left | Disc.: Cerro Tololo || 
|- id="2001 QS336" bgcolor=#E9E9E9
| 0 ||  || MBA-M || 17.69 || 1.2 km || multiple || 2001–2021 || 14 Apr 2021 || 71 || align=left | Disc.: Cerro Tololo || 
|- id="2001 QT336" bgcolor=#E9E9E9
| 0 ||  || MBA-M || 17.6 || 1.3 km || multiple || 2001–2020 || 23 Dec 2020 || 47 || align=left | Disc.: Spacewatch || 
|- id="2001 QU336" bgcolor=#fefefe
| 1 ||  || MBA-I || 19.2 || data-sort-value="0.43" | 430 m || multiple || 2001–2017 || 07 Nov 2017 || 36 || align=left | Disc.: Spacewatch || 
|- id="2001 QV336" bgcolor=#fefefe
| 0 ||  || MBA-I || 18.06 || data-sort-value="0.73" | 730 m || multiple || 2001–2021 || 12 May 2021 || 104 || align=left | Disc.: Cerro Tololo || 
|- id="2001 QW336" bgcolor=#d6d6d6
| 0 ||  || MBA-O || 17.0 || 2.2 km || multiple || 2001–2021 || 05 Jun 2021 || 68 || align=left | Disc.: Cerro Tololo || 
|- id="2001 QX336" bgcolor=#fefefe
| 0 ||  || MBA-I || 18.73 || data-sort-value="0.53" | 530 m || multiple || 2001–2021 || 14 May 2021 || 48 || align=left | Disc.: Cerro Tololo || 
|- id="2001 QY336" bgcolor=#fefefe
| 0 ||  || MBA-I || 18.4 || data-sort-value="0.62" | 620 m || multiple || 1994–2021 || 10 Apr 2021 || 72 || align=left | Disc.: Spacewatch || 
|- id="2001 QZ336" bgcolor=#fefefe
| 0 ||  || MBA-I || 18.85 || data-sort-value="0.50" | 500 m || multiple || 2001–2021 || 25 Nov 2021 || 64 || align=left | Disc.: NEAT || 
|- id="2001 QA337" bgcolor=#E9E9E9
| 1 ||  || MBA-M || 18.0 || 1.1 km || multiple || 2001–2016 || 15 Mar 2016 || 36 || align=left | Disc.: Cerro Tololo || 
|- id="2001 QB337" bgcolor=#d6d6d6
| 0 ||  || MBA-O || 17.2 || 2.0 km || multiple || 2001–2019 || 04 Feb 2019 || 32 || align=left | Disc.: Spacewatch || 
|- id="2001 QC337" bgcolor=#fefefe
| 0 ||  || MBA-I || 17.96 || data-sort-value="0.76" | 760 m || multiple || 2001–2022 || 25 Jan 2022 || 43 || align=left | Disc.: NEAT || 
|- id="2001 QD337" bgcolor=#d6d6d6
| 0 ||  || MBA-O || 16.7 || 2.5 km || multiple || 2001–2019 || 06 Oct 2019 || 50 || align=left | Disc.: Spacewatch || 
|- id="2001 QE337" bgcolor=#d6d6d6
| 0 ||  || MBA-O || 17.1 || 2.1 km || multiple || 2001–2020 || 15 May 2020 || 33 || align=left | Disc.: Spacewatch || 
|- id="2001 QF337" bgcolor=#fefefe
| 0 ||  || MBA-I || 18.1 || data-sort-value="0.71" | 710 m || multiple || 2001–2019 || 28 Oct 2019 || 72 || align=left | Disc.: Spacewatch || 
|- id="2001 QG337" bgcolor=#E9E9E9
| 0 ||  || MBA-M || 17.70 || data-sort-value="0.86" | 860 m || multiple || 2001–2021 || 13 May 2021 || 87 || align=left | Disc.: Spacewatch || 
|- id="2001 QH337" bgcolor=#fefefe
| 0 ||  || MBA-I || 18.5 || data-sort-value="0.59" | 590 m || multiple || 2001–2018 || 08 Nov 2018 || 65 || align=left | Disc.: Spacewatch || 
|- id="2001 QK337" bgcolor=#d6d6d6
| 0 ||  || MBA-O || 16.63 || 2.6 km || multiple || 2001–2021 || 27 Nov 2021 || 112 || align=left | Disc.: Spacewatch || 
|- id="2001 QL337" bgcolor=#d6d6d6
| 0 ||  || MBA-O || 16.5 || 2.8 km || multiple || 2001–2018 || 15 Oct 2018 || 60 || align=left | Disc.: Spacewatch || 
|- id="2001 QM337" bgcolor=#d6d6d6
| 0 ||  || MBA-O || 16.98 || 2.2 km || multiple || 2001–2021 || 15 Apr 2021 || 66 || align=left | Disc.: Cerro Tololo || 
|- id="2001 QN337" bgcolor=#d6d6d6
| 0 ||  || MBA-O || 16.7 || 2.5 km || multiple || 2001–2019 || 02 Nov 2019 || 52 || align=left | Disc.: Spacewatch || 
|- id="2001 QO337" bgcolor=#fefefe
| 0 ||  || MBA-I || 18.7 || data-sort-value="0.54" | 540 m || multiple || 2001–2019 || 23 Sep 2019 || 58 || align=left | Disc.: NEAT || 
|- id="2001 QP337" bgcolor=#E9E9E9
| 1 ||  || MBA-M || 17.0 || 1.2 km || multiple || 1995–2020 || 19 Apr 2020 || 90 || align=left | Disc.: Spacewatch || 
|- id="2001 QQ337" bgcolor=#E9E9E9
| 0 ||  || MBA-M || 17.79 || data-sort-value="0.82" | 820 m || multiple || 2001–2021 || 30 Jun 2021 || 55 || align=left | Disc.: NEAT || 
|- id="2001 QR337" bgcolor=#E9E9E9
| 0 ||  || MBA-M || 18.5 || 1.1 km || multiple || 2001–2019 || 01 Nov 2019 || 48 || align=left | Disc.: Cerro Tololo || 
|- id="2001 QS337" bgcolor=#E9E9E9
| 0 ||  || MBA-M || 17.6 || 1.7 km || multiple || 2001–2020 || 16 Dec 2020 || 54 || align=left | Disc.: Spacewatch || 
|- id="2001 QT337" bgcolor=#E9E9E9
| 0 ||  || MBA-M || 17.0 || 1.7 km || multiple || 2001–2020 || 15 Feb 2020 || 74 || align=left | Disc.: NEAT || 
|- id="2001 QV337" bgcolor=#d6d6d6
| 0 ||  || MBA-O || 16.8 || 2.4 km || multiple || 1998–2020 || 21 Apr 2020 || 80 || align=left | Disc.: Spacewatch || 
|- id="2001 QW337" bgcolor=#E9E9E9
| 0 ||  || MBA-M || 17.8 || 1.2 km || multiple || 2001–2018 || 09 Jul 2018 || 46 || align=left | Disc.: LONEOS || 
|- id="2001 QY337" bgcolor=#fefefe
| 1 ||  || MBA-I || 18.7 || data-sort-value="0.54" | 540 m || multiple || 2001–2019 || 06 Sep 2019 || 45 || align=left | Disc.: Spacewatch || 
|- id="2001 QZ337" bgcolor=#fefefe
| 0 ||  || MBA-I || 18.5 || data-sort-value="0.59" | 590 m || multiple || 2001–2019 || 24 Oct 2019 || 42 || align=left | Disc.: Spacewatch || 
|- id="2001 QA338" bgcolor=#E9E9E9
| 0 ||  || MBA-M || 17.9 || data-sort-value="0.78" | 780 m || multiple || 2001–2021 || 14 May 2021 || 104 || align=left | Disc.: Spacewatch || 
|- id="2001 QB338" bgcolor=#d6d6d6
| 0 ||  || MBA-O || 16.6 || 2.7 km || multiple || 2001–2021 || 15 Jan 2021 || 43 || align=left | Disc.: Spacewatch || 
|- id="2001 QC338" bgcolor=#d6d6d6
| 0 ||  || MBA-O || 17.3 || 1.9 km || multiple || 2001–2019 || 09 Feb 2019 || 45 || align=left | Disc.: Cerro Tololo || 
|- id="2001 QD338" bgcolor=#E9E9E9
| 0 ||  || MBA-M || 17.5 || 1.3 km || multiple || 2001–2021 || 12 Jan 2021 || 40 || align=left | Disc.: Spacewatch || 
|- id="2001 QF338" bgcolor=#fefefe
| 0 ||  || MBA-I || 18.9 || data-sort-value="0.49" | 490 m || multiple || 2001–2019 || 26 Sep 2019 || 31 || align=left | Disc.: Spacewatch || 
|- id="2001 QG338" bgcolor=#fefefe
| 1 ||  || MBA-I || 19.3 || data-sort-value="0.41" | 410 m || multiple || 2001–2019 || 19 Sep 2019 || 30 || align=left | Disc.: Spacewatch || 
|- id="2001 QH338" bgcolor=#d6d6d6
| 0 ||  || MBA-O || 16.6 || 2.7 km || multiple || 2001–2020 || 01 Jan 2020 || 38 || align=left | Disc.: Spacewatch || 
|- id="2001 QJ338" bgcolor=#fefefe
| 0 ||  || MBA-I || 19.0 || data-sort-value="0.47" | 470 m || multiple || 2001–2019 || 28 Aug 2019 || 30 || align=left | Disc.: Spacewatch || 
|- id="2001 QK338" bgcolor=#E9E9E9
| 0 ||  || MBA-M || 18.0 || 1.4 km || multiple || 2001–2019 || 23 Sep 2019 || 70 || align=left | Disc.: Spacewatch || 
|- id="2001 QL338" bgcolor=#d6d6d6
| 0 ||  || MBA-O || 16.4 || 2.9 km || multiple || 2001–2019 || 28 Nov 2019 || 57 || align=left | Disc.: Spacewatch || 
|- id="2001 QM338" bgcolor=#E9E9E9
| 0 ||  || MBA-M || 17.5 || 1.8 km || multiple || 2001–2019 || 28 Aug 2019 || 54 || align=left | Disc.: Spacewatch || 
|- id="2001 QN338" bgcolor=#fefefe
| 0 ||  || MBA-I || 18.42 || data-sort-value="0.62" | 620 m || multiple || 2001–2019 || 07 Jun 2019 || 54 || align=left | Disc.: LONEOS || 
|- id="2001 QO338" bgcolor=#fefefe
| 0 ||  || MBA-I || 18.4 || data-sort-value="0.62" | 620 m || multiple || 2001–2019 || 28 Aug 2019 || 49 || align=left | Disc.: Spacewatch || 
|- id="2001 QP338" bgcolor=#E9E9E9
| 0 ||  || MBA-M || 17.4 || 1.8 km || multiple || 2001–2021 || 05 Jan 2021 || 49 || align=left | Disc.: Spacewatch || 
|- id="2001 QQ338" bgcolor=#E9E9E9
| 0 ||  || MBA-M || 17.9 || 1.5 km || multiple || 2001–2020 || 14 Nov 2020 || 39 || align=left | Disc.: Spacewatch || 
|- id="2001 QR338" bgcolor=#E9E9E9
| 0 ||  || MBA-M || 17.2 || 2.0 km || multiple || 2001–2020 || 12 Nov 2020 || 61 || align=left | Disc.: Calar Alto Obs. || 
|- id="2001 QS338" bgcolor=#E9E9E9
| 0 ||  || MBA-M || 17.7 || 1.6 km || multiple || 2001–2020 || 11 Dec 2020 || 37 || align=left | Disc.: Spacewatch || 
|- id="2001 QT338" bgcolor=#d6d6d6
| 0 ||  || MBA-O || 17.1 || 2.1 km || multiple || 2001–2019 || 27 Nov 2019 || 61 || align=left | Disc.: Spacewatch || 
|- id="2001 QU338" bgcolor=#fefefe
| 0 ||  || MBA-I || 18.27 || data-sort-value="0.66" | 660 m || multiple || 2001–2021 || 11 Apr 2021 || 48 || align=left | Disc.: NEAT || 
|- id="2001 QX338" bgcolor=#d6d6d6
| 1 ||  || MBA-O || 18.29 || 1.2 km || multiple || 2001–2021 || 08 Sep 2021 || 37 || align=left | Disc.: Spacewatch || 
|- id="2001 QY338" bgcolor=#E9E9E9
| 1 ||  || MBA-M || 16.7 || 1.9 km || multiple || 2001–2020 || 14 Feb 2020 || 87 || align=left | Disc.: NEAT || 
|- id="2001 QZ338" bgcolor=#fefefe
| 0 ||  || MBA-I || 18.78 || data-sort-value="0.52" | 520 m || multiple || 2001–2021 || 08 Jun 2021 || 45 || align=left | Disc.: Spacewatch || 
|- id="2001 QB339" bgcolor=#E9E9E9
| 1 ||  || MBA-M || 17.3 || 1.0 km || multiple || 1997–2020 || 23 Mar 2020 || 45 || align=left | Disc.: LONEOS || 
|- id="2001 QC339" bgcolor=#E9E9E9
| 2 ||  || MBA-M || 18.2 || data-sort-value="0.68" | 680 m || multiple || 2001–2021 || 07 Jun 2021 || 55 || align=left | Disc.: Spacewatch || 
|- id="2001 QE339" bgcolor=#d6d6d6
| 2 ||  || HIL || 16.0 || 3.5 km || multiple || 1993–2017 || 21 Sep 2017 || 27 || align=left | Disc.: SpacewatchAdded on 22 July 2020 || 
|- id="2001 QF339" bgcolor=#fefefe
| 0 ||  || MBA-I || 18.14 || data-sort-value="0.70" | 700 m || multiple || 2001–2021 || 16 May 2021 || 66 || align=left | Disc.: SpacewatchAdded on 19 October 2020 || 
|- id="2001 QG339" bgcolor=#fefefe
| 4 ||  || MBA-I || 19.7 || data-sort-value="0.34" | 340 m || multiple || 2001–2015 || 12 Sep 2015 || 27 || align=left | Disc.: SpacewatchAdded on 19 October 2020 || 
|- id="2001 QH339" bgcolor=#E9E9E9
| 2 ||  || MBA-M || 18.7 || data-sort-value="0.54" | 540 m || multiple || 2001–2018 || 13 Dec 2018 || 26 || align=left | Disc.: SpacewatchAdded on 19 October 2020 || 
|- id="2001 QK339" bgcolor=#fefefe
| 1 ||  || MBA-I || 18.7 || data-sort-value="0.54" | 540 m || multiple || 2001–2020 || 26 Sep 2020 || 39 || align=left | Disc.: Spacewatch Added on 17 January 2021 || 
|- id="2001 QL339" bgcolor=#d6d6d6
| 0 ||  || MBA-O || 16.8 || 2.4 km || multiple || 2001–2021 || 07 Feb 2021 || 55 || align=left | Disc.: SpacewatchAdded on 11 May 2021 || 
|- id="2001 QM339" bgcolor=#E9E9E9
| 0 ||  || MBA-M || 17.7 || data-sort-value="0.86" | 860 m || multiple || 2001–2018 || 12 Dec 2018 || 36 || align=left | Disc.: SpacewatchAdded on 17 June 2021 || 
|- id="2001 QN339" bgcolor=#d6d6d6
| 1 ||  || MBA-O || 18.0 || 1.4 km || multiple || 2001–2021 || 08 May 2021 || 20 || align=left | Disc.: Cerro TololoAdded on 17 June 2021 || 
|- id="2001 QO339" bgcolor=#d6d6d6
| 0 ||  || MBA-O || 17.64 || 1.7 km || multiple || 2001–2021 || 31 Aug 2021 || 42 || align=left | Disc.: SpacewatchAdded on 21 August 2021 || 
|}
back to top

R 

|- id="2001 RD2" bgcolor=#FA8072
| 0 ||  || MCA || 17.76 || data-sort-value="0.83" | 830 m || multiple || 2001–2019 || 08 Feb 2019 || 71 || align=left | Disc.: LINEAR || 
|- id="2001 RG2" bgcolor=#E9E9E9
| 0 ||  || MBA-M || 17.6 || 1.3 km || multiple || 2001–2020 || 19 Jan 2020 || 58 || align=left | Disc.: LINEAR || 
|- id="2001 RK2" bgcolor=#d6d6d6
| 0 ||  || MBA-O || 15.5 || 4.4 km || multiple || 2001–2021 || 03 Jun 2021 || 210 || align=left | Disc.: LINEAR || 
|- id="2001 RX2" bgcolor=#E9E9E9
| 0 ||  || MBA-M || 17.41 || 1.4 km || multiple || 2001–2021 || 09 Apr 2021 || 117 || align=left | Disc.: Desert Eagle Obs.Alt.: 2014 SG301 || 
|- id="2001 RO3" bgcolor=#FFC2E0
| 2 ||  || APO || 23.5 || data-sort-value="0.071" | 71 m || single || 34 days || 11 Oct 2001 || 68 || align=left | Disc.: LINEARAMO at MPC || 
|- id="2001 RP3" bgcolor=#FFC2E0
| 4 ||  || AMO || 23.4 || data-sort-value="0.074" | 74 m || single || 33 days || 11 Oct 2001 || 61 || align=left | Disc.: LONEOS || 
|- id="2001 RR3" bgcolor=#FA8072
| 1 ||  || MCA || 17.9 || data-sort-value="0.78" | 780 m || multiple || 2001–2020 || 04 Dec 2020 || 102 || align=left | Disc.: LINEAR || 
|- id="2001 RK4" bgcolor=#E9E9E9
| 1 ||  || MBA-M || 17.80 || data-sort-value="0.82" | 820 m || multiple || 2001–2021 || 28 Jul 2021 || 52 || align=left | Disc.: LINEARAlt.: 2005 NW37 || 
|- id="2001 RM8" bgcolor=#E9E9E9
| 2 ||  || MBA-M || 17.7 || 1.6 km || multiple || 2001–2019 || 31 Oct 2019 || 101 || align=left | Disc.: LINEARAlt.: 2010 KM51 || 
|- id="2001 RM9" bgcolor=#fefefe
| 1 ||  || MBA-I || 17.2 || 1.1 km || multiple || 2001–2019 || 20 Nov 2019 || 109 || align=left | Disc.: LINEAR || 
|- id="2001 RJ10" bgcolor=#FA8072
| – ||  || MCA || 19.2 || data-sort-value="0.43" | 430 m || single || 41 days || 21 Oct 2001 || 21 || align=left | Disc.: LINEAR || 
|- id="2001 RF13" bgcolor=#FA8072
| 0 ||  || MCA || 19.38 || data-sort-value="0.40" | 400 m || multiple || 2001–2021 || 30 Nov 2021 || 68 || align=left | Disc.: LINEAR || 
|- id="2001 RB14" bgcolor=#fefefe
| 1 ||  || MBA-I || 18.6 || data-sort-value="0.57" | 570 m || multiple || 2001–2019 || 29 Oct 2019 || 90 || align=left | Disc.: LINEAR || 
|- id="2001 RS15" bgcolor=#FA8072
| 1 ||  || MCA || 18.2 || data-sort-value="0.68" | 680 m || multiple || 2001–2019 || 10 Jul 2019 || 71 || align=left | Disc.: LINEAR || 
|- id="2001 RE16" bgcolor=#FA8072
| – ||  || MCA || 19.5 || data-sort-value="0.53" | 530 m || single || 38 days || 19 Oct 2001 || 22 || align=left | Disc.: LINEARMBA at MPC || 
|- id="2001 RQ17" bgcolor=#FFC2E0
| 0 ||  || APO || 22.6 || data-sort-value="0.11" | 110 m || multiple || 2001–2018 || 18 Oct 2018 || 182 || align=left | Disc.: LINEARAMO at MPC || 
|- id="2001 RW17" bgcolor=#FFC2E0
| 0 ||  || APO || 20.3 || data-sort-value="0.31" | 310 m || multiple || 2001–2019 || 25 Sep 2019 || 257 || align=left | Disc.: LONEOS || 
|- id="2001 RX17" bgcolor=#FFC2E0
| 4 ||  || AMO || 20.0 || data-sort-value="0.36" | 360 m || single || 119 days || 08 Jan 2002 || 62 || align=left | Disc.: LONEOS || 
|- id="2001 RA18" bgcolor=#FFC2E0
| 0 ||  || AMO || 19.54 || data-sort-value="0.44" | 440 m || multiple || 2001–2019 || 13 Jan 2019 || 64 || align=left | Disc.: LINEAR || 
|- id="2001 RY19" bgcolor=#d6d6d6
| 2 ||  || MBA-O || 17.0 || 2.2 km || multiple || 2001–2016 || 02 Apr 2016 || 48 || align=left | Disc.: LINEARAlt.: 2012 SF23 || 
|- id="2001 RX20" bgcolor=#FA8072
| 0 ||  || MCA || 18.68 || data-sort-value="0.55" | 550 m || multiple || 2001–2021 || 30 May 2021 || 56 || align=left | Disc.: LINEAR || 
|- id="2001 RK21" bgcolor=#E9E9E9
| 0 ||  || MBA-M || 16.66 || 2.0 km || multiple || 2001–2021 || 12 May 2021 || 228 || align=left | Disc.: LINEAR || 
|- id="2001 RT21" bgcolor=#d6d6d6
| 1 ||  || MBA-O || 17.62 || 1.7 km || multiple || 2001-2022 || 01 Dec 2022 || 63 || align=left | Disc.: LINEARAlt.: 2022 SD241 || 
|- id="2001 RV22" bgcolor=#fefefe
| 0 ||  || MBA-I || 18.25 || data-sort-value="0.67" | 670 m || multiple || 1994–2021 || 15 Apr 2021 || 117 || align=left | Disc.: LINEAR || 
|- id="2001 RK23" bgcolor=#E9E9E9
| 0 ||  || MBA-M || 17.3 || 1.9 km || multiple || 2001–2020 || 20 Dec 2020 || 105 || align=left | Disc.: LINEARAlt.: 2015 UB79 || 
|- id="2001 RF33" bgcolor=#E9E9E9
| 3 ||  || MBA-M || 18.7 || data-sort-value="0.54" | 540 m || multiple || 2001–2005 || 16 Jun 2005 || 15 || align=left | Disc.: LINEAR || 
|- id="2001 RD35" bgcolor=#E9E9E9
| 1 ||  || MBA-M || 17.8 || data-sort-value="0.82" | 820 m || multiple || 2001–2015 || 16 Jan 2015 || 34 || align=left | Disc.: LINEAR || 
|- id="2001 RJ36" bgcolor=#fefefe
| 1 ||  || MBA-I || 18.1 || data-sort-value="0.71" | 710 m || multiple || 2001–2018 || 19 Apr 2018 || 125 || align=left | Disc.: LINEARAlt.: 2015 OF78 || 
|- id="2001 RA37" bgcolor=#d6d6d6
| 0 ||  || MBA-O || 16.87 || 2.4 km || multiple || 2001–2021 || 26 Aug 2021 || 95 || align=left | Disc.: LINEAR || 
|- id="2001 RW39" bgcolor=#d6d6d6
| 2 ||  || MBA-O || 16.6 || 2.7 km || multiple || 2001–2018 || 06 Nov 2018 || 57 || align=left | Disc.: LINEAR || 
|- id="2001 RY39" bgcolor=#E9E9E9
| 0 ||  || MBA-M || 17.05 || 1.6 km || multiple || 2001–2021 || 09 Apr 2021 || 122 || align=left | Disc.: LINEAR || 
|- id="2001 RA40" bgcolor=#fefefe
| 0 ||  || MBA-I || 18.8 || data-sort-value="0.52" | 520 m || multiple || 2001–2019 || 28 Oct 2019 || 60 || align=left | Disc.: LINEAR || 
|- id="2001 RR40" bgcolor=#FA8072
| 1 ||  || MCA || 17.5 || data-sort-value="0.94" | 940 m || multiple || 2001–2015 || 12 Feb 2015 || 65 || align=left | Disc.: LINEAR || 
|- id="2001 RR41" bgcolor=#d6d6d6
| 0 ||  || MBA-O || 16.30 || 3.1 km || multiple || 2001–2021 || 15 Apr 2021 || 104 || align=left | Disc.: LINEARAlt.: 2015 EH68 || 
|- id="2001 RG42" bgcolor=#E9E9E9
| 0 ||  || MBA-M || 18.04 || 1.0 km || multiple || 2001–2019 || 30 Dec 2019 || 37 || align=left | Disc.: LINEARAlt.: 2014 SP289 || 
|- id="2001 RN43" bgcolor=#FA8072
| 5 ||  || MCA || 18.4 || 1.2 km || single || 66 days || 25 Oct 2001 || 41 || align=left | Disc.: LINEAR || 
|- id="2001 RW43" bgcolor=#fefefe
| 0 ||  || MBA-I || 18.1 || data-sort-value="0.71" | 710 m || multiple || 2001–2019 || 17 Dec 2019 || 89 || align=left | Disc.: Farpoint Obs.Added on 30 September 2021Alt.: 2005 XA129 || 
|- id="2001 RO46" bgcolor=#FA8072
| 1 ||  || MCA || 17.8 || data-sort-value="0.82" | 820 m || multiple || 2001–2021 || 04 Jan 2021 || 156 || align=left | Disc.: LINEAR || 
|- id="2001 RP46" bgcolor=#fefefe
| 1 ||  || HUN || 18.7 || data-sort-value="0.54" | 540 m || multiple || 2001–2019 || 07 Apr 2019 || 51 || align=left | Disc.: LINEARAlt.: 2016 DH1 || 
|- id="2001 RQ46" bgcolor=#FA8072
| 0 ||  || MCA || 18.12 || data-sort-value="0.71" | 710 m || multiple || 2001–2021 || 09 Nov 2021 || 70 || align=left | Disc.: LINEAR || 
|- id="2001 RF47" bgcolor=#FA8072
| 0 ||  || HUN || 18.1 || data-sort-value="0.71" | 710 m || multiple || 2001–2019 || 25 Nov 2019 || 192 || align=left | Disc.: LINEAR || 
|- id="2001 RH47" bgcolor=#fefefe
| 2 ||  || MBA-I || 18.0 || data-sort-value="0.75" | 750 m || multiple || 2001–2015 || 15 Oct 2015 || 47 || align=left | Disc.: LINEAR || 
|- id="2001 RL47" bgcolor=#E9E9E9
| 0 ||  || MBA-M || 17.39 || 1.4 km || multiple || 2001–2021 || 14 Apr 2021 || 70 || align=left | Disc.: LINEAR || 
|- id="2001 RM47" bgcolor=#fefefe
| 0 ||  || MBA-I || 18.18 || data-sort-value="0.69" | 690 m || multiple || 2001–2021 || 15 Apr 2021 || 78 || align=left | Disc.: LINEARAlt.: 2012 TM319 || 
|- id="2001 RN47" bgcolor=#FA8072
| 1 ||  || HUN || 18.0 || data-sort-value="0.75" | 750 m || multiple || 1995–2019 || 06 Dec 2019 || 241 || align=left | Disc.: LINEAR || 
|- id="2001 RX47" bgcolor=#FFC2E0
| 1 ||  || AMO || 19.89 || data-sort-value="0.37" | 370 m || multiple || 2001–2021 || 18 Jun 2021 || 53 || align=left | Disc.: LINEARAlt.: 2021 LO1 || 
|- id="2001 RK50" bgcolor=#fefefe
| 0 ||  || MBA-I || 18.29 || data-sort-value="0.65" | 650 m || multiple || 2000–2021 || 08 May 2021 || 87 || align=left | Disc.: LINEAR || 
|- id="2001 RJ51" bgcolor=#E9E9E9
| 0 ||  || MBA-M || 17.06 || 2.2 km || multiple || 2001–2021 || 06 Apr 2021 || 176 || align=left | Disc.: LINEAR || 
|- id="2001 RW51" bgcolor=#d6d6d6
| 0 ||  || MBA-O || 16.4 || 2.9 km || multiple || 2001–2020 || 16 Mar 2020 || 62 || align=left | Disc.: LINEARAlt.: 2013 YX62 || 
|- id="2001 RW52" bgcolor=#E9E9E9
| 0 ||  || MBA-M || 17.3 || 1.9 km || multiple || 2001–2021 || 07 Jan 2021 || 158 || align=left | Disc.: LINEARAlt.: 2015 RY118 || 
|- id="2001 RR54" bgcolor=#E9E9E9
| 0 ||  || MBA-M || 17.4 || 1.4 km || multiple || 2001–2018 || 12 Oct 2018 || 95 || align=left | Disc.: LINEARAlt.: 2013 LV14 || 
|- id="2001 RX54" bgcolor=#fefefe
| 0 ||  || MBA-I || 18.3 || data-sort-value="0.65" | 650 m || multiple || 2001–2019 || 28 Dec 2019 || 90 || align=left | Disc.: LINEAR || 
|- id="2001 RB55" bgcolor=#fefefe
| 1 ||  || MBA-I || 17.6 || data-sort-value="0.90" | 900 m || multiple || 2001–2020 || 15 Aug 2020 || 84 || align=left | Disc.: LINEARAlt.: 2009 VA12 || 
|- id="2001 RU55" bgcolor=#fefefe
| 3 ||  || MBA-I || 18.1 || data-sort-value="0.71" | 710 m || multiple || 2001–2021 || 18 Jan 2021 || 33 || align=left | Disc.: LINEARAlt.: 2012 TD60 || 
|- id="2001 RA56" bgcolor=#fefefe
| 0 ||  || MBA-I || 18.2 || data-sort-value="0.68" | 680 m || multiple || 2001–2020 || 07 Dec 2020 || 53 || align=left | Disc.: LINEAR || 
|- id="2001 RV58" bgcolor=#fefefe
| 2 ||  || MBA-I || 18.1 || data-sort-value="0.71" | 710 m || multiple || 2001–2020 || 20 Jul 2020 || 37 || align=left | Disc.: LINEARAdded on 24 August 2020 || 
|- id="2001 RE59" bgcolor=#E9E9E9
| 0 ||  || MBA-M || 17.15 || 1.6 km || multiple || 2001–2021 || 13 May 2021 || 256 || align=left | Disc.: LINEAR || 
|- id="2001 RY59" bgcolor=#E9E9E9
| 2 ||  || MBA-M || 18.6 || data-sort-value="0.80" | 800 m || multiple || 2001–2018 || 13 Dec 2018 || 65 || align=left | Disc.: LINEAR || 
|- id="2001 RZ59" bgcolor=#fefefe
| 0 ||  || MBA-I || 17.4 || data-sort-value="0.98" | 980 m || multiple || 2001–2021 || 09 Jan 2021 || 143 || align=left | Disc.: LINEARAlt.: 2012 UK50, 2015 QW || 
|- id="2001 RN60" bgcolor=#fefefe
| 0 ||  || MBA-I || 17.6 || data-sort-value="0.90" | 900 m || multiple || 2001–2021 || 15 Jan 2021 || 131 || align=left | Disc.: LINEARAlt.: 2012 TC217 || 
|- id="2001 RX61" bgcolor=#E9E9E9
| 0 ||  || MBA-M || 17.45 || 1.4 km || multiple || 2001–2021 || 18 Apr 2021 || 104 || align=left | Disc.: LINEAR || 
|- id="2001 RL95" bgcolor=#FA8072
| 0 ||  || MCA || 18.15 || data-sort-value="0.98" | 700 m || multiple || 2001-2022 || 19 Dec 202 || 181 || align=left | Disc.: LINEAR || 
|- id="2001 RQ95" bgcolor=#fefefe
| 0 ||  || MBA-I || 18.2 || data-sort-value="0.68" | 680 m || multiple || 2001–2020 || 17 Nov 2020 || 92 || align=left | Disc.: LINEAR || 
|- id="2001 RR95" bgcolor=#fefefe
| 1 ||  || MBA-I || 17.6 || data-sort-value="0.90" | 900 m || multiple || 2001–2020 || 24 Jan 2020 || 64 || align=left | Disc.: LINEAR || 
|- id="2001 RF96" bgcolor=#E9E9E9
| 0 ||  || MBA-M || 17.36 || 1.4 km || multiple || 2001–2021 || 18 May 2021 || 105 || align=left | Disc.: Spacewatch || 
|- id="2001 RU96" bgcolor=#d6d6d6
| 0 ||  || MBA-O || 15.9 || 3.7 km || multiple || 2001–2021 || 23 Jan 2021 || 123 || align=left | Disc.: SpacewatchAlt.: 2010 KF149 || 
|- id="2001 RX96" bgcolor=#fefefe
| 0 ||  || MBA-I || 19.0 || data-sort-value="0.47" | 470 m || multiple || 2001–2020 || 23 Sep 2020 || 62 || align=left | Disc.: Spacewatch Added on 17 January 2021 || 
|- id="2001 RE97" bgcolor=#fefefe
| 0 ||  || MBA-I || 18.8 || data-sort-value="0.52" | 520 m || multiple || 2001–2019 || 03 Oct 2019 || 145 || align=left | Disc.: Spacewatch || 
|- id="2001 RO97" bgcolor=#d6d6d6
| 3 ||  || MBA-O || 17.91 || 1.5 km || multiple || 2001–2018 || 06 Oct 2018 || 21 || align=left | Disc.: SpacewatchAdded on 24 December 2021 || 
|- id="2001 RB98" bgcolor=#E9E9E9
| 1 ||  || MBA-M || 18.97 || data-sort-value="0.53" | 700 m || multiple || 2001-2022 || 19 Oct 2022 || 42 || align=left | Disc.: SpacewatchAlt.: 2018 VQ57 || 
|- id="2001 RN98" bgcolor=#E9E9E9
| 4 ||  || MBA-M || 18.8 || data-sort-value="0.73" | 730 m || multiple || 2001–2018 || 10 Nov 2018 || 21 || align=left | Disc.: SpacewatchAdded on 21 August 2021 || 
|- id="2001 RZ98" bgcolor=#fefefe
| 0 ||  || MBA-I || 17.9 || data-sort-value="0.78" | 780 m || multiple || 2001–2021 || 17 Jan 2021 || 140 || align=left | Disc.: LINEARAlt.: 2005 UU321 || 
|- id="2001 RA102" bgcolor=#E9E9E9
| 0 ||  || MBA-M || 17.31 || 1.0 km || multiple || 2001–2021 || 08 Aug 2021 || 54 || align=left | Disc.: LINEAR || 
|- id="2001 RH103" bgcolor=#E9E9E9
| 0 ||  || MBA-M || 17.3 || 1.5 km || multiple || 2001–2019 || 04 Dec 2019 || 121 || align=left | Disc.: LINEARAlt.: 2010 UW31 || 
|- id="2001 RD104" bgcolor=#fefefe
| 0 ||  || MBA-I || 17.92 || data-sort-value="0.77" | 770 m || multiple || 2001–2021 || 08 May 2021 || 120 || align=left | Disc.: LINEARAlt.: 2008 RL48 || 
|- id="2001 RB105" bgcolor=#d6d6d6
| 0 ||  || MBA-O || 16.8 || 2.4 km || multiple || 2001–2019 || 08 Dec 2019 || 97 || align=left | Disc.: LINEAR || 
|- id="2001 RF106" bgcolor=#fefefe
| 0 ||  || MBA-I || 17.9 || data-sort-value="0.78" | 780 m || multiple || 2001–2020 || 20 Dec 2020 || 124 || align=left | Disc.: LINEARAlt.: 2016 SU26 || 
|- id="2001 RX106" bgcolor=#fefefe
| 0 ||  || MBA-I || 17.7 || data-sort-value="0.86" | 860 m || multiple || 1994–2019 || 24 Dec 2019 || 90 || align=left | Disc.: LINEAR || 
|- id="2001 RQ107" bgcolor=#fefefe
| 2 ||  || MBA-I || 18.9 || data-sort-value="0.49" | 490 m || multiple || 2001–2019 || 03 Dec 2019 || 36 || align=left | Disc.: LINEAR || 
|- id="2001 RT107" bgcolor=#d6d6d6
| – ||  || MBA-O || 15.7 || 4.0 km || single || 7 days || 19 Sep 2001 || 9 || align=left | Disc.: LINEAR || 
|- id="2001 RE109" bgcolor=#fefefe
| 0 ||  || MBA-I || 18.8 || data-sort-value="0.52" | 520 m || multiple || 2001–2019 || 29 Nov 2019 || 82 || align=left | Disc.: LINEAR || 
|- id="2001 RF109" bgcolor=#E9E9E9
| 9 ||  || MBA-M || 17.80 || 1.5 km || single || 7 days || 19 Sep 2001 || 11 || align=left | Disc.: LINEARAdded on 21 August 2021 || 
|- id="2001 RZ109" bgcolor=#E9E9E9
| 3 ||  || MBA-M || 17.8 || 1.2 km || multiple || 2001–2014 || 23 Nov 2014 || 52 || align=left | Disc.: LINEARAlt.: 2014 QY305 || 
|- id="2001 RS112" bgcolor=#E9E9E9
| – ||  || MBA-M || 17.8 || data-sort-value="0.82" | 820 m || single || 54 days || 11 Oct 2001 || 20 || align=left | Disc.: LINEAR || 
|- id="2001 RT112" bgcolor=#fefefe
| 1 ||  || MBA-I || 19.0 || data-sort-value="0.47" | 470 m || multiple || 2001–2020 || 02 Feb 2020 || 95 || align=left | Disc.: LINEAR || 
|- id="2001 RZ112" bgcolor=#E9E9E9
| 0 ||  || MBA-M || 18.0 || 1.4 km || multiple || 2001–2019 || 02 Jul 2019 || 53 || align=left | Disc.: LINEAR || 
|- id="2001 RM114" bgcolor=#FA8072
| 1 ||  || MCA || 18.7 || data-sort-value="0.54" | 540 m || multiple || 2001–2015 || 02 Dec 2015 || 57 || align=left | Disc.: LINEARAlt.: 2008 UK235 || 
|- id="2001 RZ114" bgcolor=#fefefe
| 3 ||  || MBA-I || 18.2 || data-sort-value="0.68" | 680 m || multiple || 2001–2019 || 24 Aug 2019 || 41 || align=left | Disc.: LINEAR || 
|- id="2001 RB117" bgcolor=#fefefe
| 0 ||  || MBA-I || 18.2 || data-sort-value="0.68" | 680 m || multiple || 2001–2020 || 20 Dec 2020 || 110 || align=left | Disc.: LINEARAlt.: 2005 VW63 || 
|- id="2001 RJ117" bgcolor=#fefefe
| 0 ||  || MBA-I || 18.6 || data-sort-value="0.57" | 570 m || multiple || 2001–2020 || 14 Nov 2020 || 74 || align=left | Disc.: LINEAR || 
|- id="2001 RF118" bgcolor=#fefefe
| 0 ||  || MBA-I || 18.2 || data-sort-value="0.68" | 680 m || multiple || 2001–2019 || 28 Nov 2019 || 82 || align=left | Disc.: LINEAR || 
|- id="2001 RW119" bgcolor=#d6d6d6
| 0 ||  || MBA-O || 16.1 || 3.4 km || multiple || 2001–2021 || 10 Jun 2021 || 238 || align=left | Disc.: LINEAR || 
|- id="2001 RT121" bgcolor=#fefefe
| 0 ||  || MBA-I || 18.1 || data-sort-value="0.71" | 710 m || multiple || 2001–2020 || 17 Nov 2020 || 110 || align=left | Disc.: LINEARAlt.: 2005 UE83 || 
|- id="2001 RS122" bgcolor=#E9E9E9
| 2 ||  || MBA-M || 17.8 || data-sort-value="0.82" | 820 m || multiple || 2001–2018 || 10 Dec 2018 || 60 || align=left | Disc.: LINEAR || 
|- id="2001 RB127" bgcolor=#E9E9E9
| 0 ||  || MBA-M || 17.13 || 1.6 km || multiple || 1997–2021 || 15 Apr 2021 || 175 || align=left | Disc.: LINEAR || 
|- id="2001 RM128" bgcolor=#E9E9E9
| 0 ||  || MBA-M || 17.25 || 1.1 km || multiple || 2001–2021 || 03 May 2021 || 99 || align=left | Disc.: LINEAR || 
|- id="2001 RJ130" bgcolor=#fefefe
| 0 ||  || MBA-I || 17.8 || data-sort-value="0.82" | 820 m || multiple || 2001–2020 || 11 Oct 2020 || 124 || align=left | Disc.: LINEARAlt.: 2009 WR194 || 
|- id="2001 RS131" bgcolor=#E9E9E9
| 0 ||  || MBA-M || 16.99 || 2.2 km || multiple || 2001–2022 || 27 Jan 2022 || 197 || align=left | Disc.: LINEAR || 
|- id="2001 RN133" bgcolor=#E9E9E9
| 0 ||  || MBA-M || 17.52 || data-sort-value="0.93" | 930 m || multiple || 2001–2021 || 01 May 2021 || 125 || align=left | Disc.: LINEAR || 
|- id="2001 RL134" bgcolor=#E9E9E9
| 0 ||  || MBA-M || 16.95 || 2.3 km || multiple || 2001–2021 || 01 Apr 2021 || 252 || align=left | Disc.: LINEAR || 
|- id="2001 RN134" bgcolor=#E9E9E9
| 1 ||  || MBA-M || 17.2 || 1.5 km || multiple || 2001–2014 || 12 Dec 2014 || 71 || align=left | Disc.: LINEAR || 
|- id="2001 RJ137" bgcolor=#E9E9E9
| 1 ||  || MBA-M || 18.57 || data-sort-value="0.54" | 580 m || multiple || 2001-2022 || 18 Nov 2022 || 49 || align=left | Disc.: LINEAR || 
|- id="2001 RO137" bgcolor=#d6d6d6
| 1 ||  || MBA-O || 16.1 || 3.4 km || multiple || 2001–2021 || 07 Mar 2021 || 47 || align=left | Disc.: LINEARAlt.: 2018 PZ55 || 
|- id="2001 RM138" bgcolor=#FA8072
| 0 ||  || MCA || 19.39 || data-sort-value="0.39" | 390 m || multiple || 2001–2018 || 05 Nov 2018 || 39 || align=left | Disc.: LINEAR || 
|- id="2001 RD140" bgcolor=#E9E9E9
| 0 ||  || MBA-M || 18.16 || data-sort-value="0.69" | 690 m || multiple || 2001–2021 || 07 Jun 2021 || 72 || align=left | Disc.: LINEARAlt.: 2017 KX5 || 
|- id="2001 RO140" bgcolor=#fefefe
| 2 ||  || MBA-I || 18.6 || data-sort-value="0.57" | 570 m || multiple || 2001–2020 || 10 Dec 2020 || 56 || align=left | Disc.: LINEAR || 
|- id="2001 RV143" bgcolor=#C2E0FF
| 3 ||  || TNO || 7.01 || 130 km || multiple || 2001-2021 || 11 Nov 2021 || 111 || align=left | Disc.: Kitt Peak Obs.LoUTNOs, cubewano? || 
|- id="2001 RW143" bgcolor=#C2E0FF
| 3 ||  || TNO || 7.0 || 132 km || multiple || 2001–2013 || 06 Oct 2013 || 20 || align=left | Disc.: Kitt Peak Obs.LoUTNOs, cubewano (cold) || 
|- id="2001 RY143" bgcolor=#C2E0FF
| 2 ||  || TNO || 7.0 || 137 km || multiple || 2001–2017 || 30 Aug 2017 || 50 || align=left | Disc.: Kitt Peak Obs.LoUTNOs, cubewano? || 
|- id="2001 RN150" bgcolor=#E9E9E9
| 0 ||  || MBA-M || 17.2 || 2.0 km || multiple || 2001–2019 || 03 Sep 2019 || 118 || align=left | Disc.: LONEOSAlt.: 2010 JQ124 || 
|- id="2001 RT150" bgcolor=#fefefe
| 0 ||  || MBA-I || 18.38 || data-sort-value="0.63" | 630 m || multiple || 2001–2022 || 25 Jan 2022 || 108 || align=left | Disc.: LONEOS || 
|- id="2001 RY153" bgcolor=#fefefe
| 0 ||  || MBA-I || 18.4 || data-sort-value="0.62" | 620 m || multiple || 2001–2020 || 16 Nov 2020 || 135 || align=left | Disc.: NEAT || 
|- id="2001 RE155" bgcolor=#E9E9E9
| 0 ||  || MBA-M || 17.10 || 1.1 km || multiple || 1997–2021 || 03 May 2021 || 131 || align=left | Disc.: LINEARAlt.: 2005 QL149 || 
|- id="2001 RL155" bgcolor=#C2E0FF
| E ||  || TNO || 7.8 || 95 km || single || 37 days || 19 Oct 2001 || 4 || align=left | Disc.: Kitt Peak Obs.LoUTNOs, cubewano? || 
|- id="2001 RF156" bgcolor=#E9E9E9
| 0 ||  || MBA-M || 19.02 || data-sort-value="0.73" | 700 m || multiple || 2001-2022 || 31 Oct 2022 || 73 || align=left | Disc.: NEATAlt.: 2022 QN142 || 
|- id="2001 RG156" bgcolor=#fefefe
| 0 ||  || MBA-I || 17.5 || data-sort-value="0.94" | 940 m || multiple || 2001–2021 || 17 Jan 2021 || 78 || align=left | Disc.: NEATAlt.: 2014 FS40 || 
|- id="2001 RJ156" bgcolor=#d6d6d6
| 0 ||  || MBA-O || 16.6 || 2.7 km || multiple || 2001–2020 || 13 May 2020 || 115 || align=left | Disc.: Kitt Peak Obs. || 
|- id="2001 RL156" bgcolor=#E9E9E9
| 0 ||  || MBA-M || 17.44 || 1.4 km || multiple || 2001–2021 || 14 Apr 2021 || 123 || align=left | Disc.: Spacewatch || 
|- id="2001 RM156" bgcolor=#E9E9E9
| 0 ||  || MBA-M || 17.6 || 1.7 km || multiple || 2001–2019 || 06 Sep 2019 || 53 || align=left | Disc.: Kitt Peak Obs. || 
|- id="2001 RN156" bgcolor=#E9E9E9
| 0 ||  || MBA-M || 17.7 || data-sort-value="0.86" | 860 m || multiple || 2001–2020 || 23 Jan 2020 || 54 || align=left | Disc.: Spacewatch || 
|- id="2001 RO156" bgcolor=#d6d6d6
| 0 ||  || HIL || 15.9 || 3.7 km || multiple || 2001–2017 || 16 Oct 2017 || 49 || align=left | Disc.: Kitt Peak Obs. || 
|- id="2001 RQ156" bgcolor=#E9E9E9
| 0 ||  || MBA-M || 17.3 || 1.9 km || multiple || 2001–2021 || 18 Jan 2021 || 80 || align=left | Disc.: Kitt Peak Obs. || 
|- id="2001 RR156" bgcolor=#fefefe
| 1 ||  || MBA-I || 18.3 || data-sort-value="0.65" | 650 m || multiple || 2001–2019 || 09 May 2019 || 46 || align=left | Disc.: Kitt Peak Obs. || 
|- id="2001 RS156" bgcolor=#E9E9E9
| 0 ||  || MBA-M || 17.99 || 1.1 km || multiple || 2001–2021 || 13 Apr 2021 || 90 || align=left | Disc.: Kitt Peak Obs. || 
|- id="2001 RT156" bgcolor=#fefefe
| 0 ||  || MBA-I || 17.7 || data-sort-value="0.86" | 860 m || multiple || 2001–2021 || 09 Jun 2021 || 81 || align=left | Disc.: Kitt Peak Obs. || 
|- id="2001 RU156" bgcolor=#d6d6d6
| 0 ||  || MBA-O || 16.93 || 2.3 km || multiple || 2001–2021 || 30 Jun 2021 || 98 || align=left | Disc.: Kitt Peak Obs.Alt.: 2010 LE131 || 
|- id="2001 RV156" bgcolor=#d6d6d6
| 0 ||  || MBA-O || 16.42 || 2.9 km || multiple || 2001–2021 || 07 Jul 2021 || 162 || align=left | Disc.: Kitt Peak Obs. || 
|- id="2001 RW156" bgcolor=#d6d6d6
| 0 ||  || MBA-O || 17.01 || 2.2 km || multiple || 2001–2021 || 15 Apr 2021 || 66 || align=left | Disc.: Spacewatch || 
|- id="2001 RX156" bgcolor=#d6d6d6
| 0 ||  || MBA-O || 17.59 || 1.7 km || multiple || 2001–2021 || 30 Nov 2021 || 56 || align=left | Disc.: Kitt Peak Obs. || 
|- id="2001 RY156" bgcolor=#E9E9E9
| 1 ||  || MBA-M || 17.65 || 1.6 km || multiple || 2001–2021 || 06 Nov 2021 || 39 || align=left | Disc.: Kitt Peak Obs. || 
|- id="2001 RZ156" bgcolor=#fefefe
| 0 ||  || MBA-I || 19.04 || data-sort-value="0.46" | 460 m || multiple || 2001–2021 || 28 Sep 2021 || 60 || align=left | Disc.: Kitt Peak Obs. || 
|- id="2001 RA157" bgcolor=#fefefe
| 0 ||  || MBA-I || 18.1 || data-sort-value="0.71" | 710 m || multiple || 2001–2020 || 07 Dec 2020 || 45 || align=left | Disc.: Spacewatch || 
|- id="2001 RB157" bgcolor=#E9E9E9
| 0 ||  || MBA-M || 18.04 || 1.0 km || multiple || 2001–2021 || 03 May 2021 || 61 || align=left | Disc.: Kitt Peak Obs. || 
|- id="2001 RC157" bgcolor=#d6d6d6
| 0 ||  || MBA-O || 17.0 || 2.2 km || multiple || 2001–2018 || 13 Aug 2018 || 29 || align=left | Disc.: Kitt Peak Obs. || 
|- id="2001 RD157" bgcolor=#fefefe
| 1 ||  || MBA-I || 18.7 || data-sort-value="0.54" | 540 m || multiple || 2001–2021 || 16 Jan 2021 || 36 || align=left | Disc.: Kitt Peak Obs. || 
|- id="2001 RF157" bgcolor=#fefefe
| 0 ||  || MBA-I || 17.8 || data-sort-value="0.82" | 820 m || multiple || 2001–2019 || 24 Dec 2019 || 92 || align=left | Disc.: Spacewatch || 
|- id="2001 RG157" bgcolor=#E9E9E9
| 0 ||  || MBA-M || 17.5 || 1.8 km || multiple || 2001–2020 || 15 Dec 2020 || 61 || align=left | Disc.: Kitt Peak Obs. || 
|- id="2001 RJ157" bgcolor=#E9E9E9
| 1 ||  || MBA-M || 17.8 || 1.5 km || multiple || 2001–2019 || 24 Dec 2019 || 53 || align=left | Disc.: Kitt Peak Obs. || 
|- id="2001 RK157" bgcolor=#fefefe
| 0 ||  || MBA-I || 18.73 || data-sort-value="0.53" | 530 m || multiple || 2001–2020 || 28 Jan 2020 || 83 || align=left | Disc.: Spacewatch || 
|- id="2001 RL157" bgcolor=#E9E9E9
| 1 ||  || MBA-M || 17.9 || data-sort-value="0.78" | 780 m || multiple || 2001–2020 || 22 Mar 2020 || 65 || align=left | Disc.: Spacewatch || 
|- id="2001 RN157" bgcolor=#E9E9E9
| 0 ||  || MBA-M || 17.50 || 1.8 km || multiple || 2001–2022 || 26 Jan 2022 || 45 || align=left | Disc.: Kitt Peak Obs. || 
|- id="2001 RO157" bgcolor=#fefefe
| 1 ||  || MBA-I || 18.30 || data-sort-value="0.65" | 650 m || multiple || 2001–2022 || 07 Jan 2022 || 45 || align=left | Disc.: Spacewatch || 
|- id="2001 RQ157" bgcolor=#d6d6d6
| 0 ||  || MBA-O || 17.20 || 2.0 km || multiple || 2001–2021 || 10 Aug 2021 || 54 || align=left | Disc.: Kitt Peak Obs. || 
|- id="2001 RU157" bgcolor=#d6d6d6
| 0 ||  || MBA-O || 16.7 || 2.5 km || multiple || 1993–2020 || 15 May 2020 || 68 || align=left | Disc.: Spacewatch || 
|- id="2001 RV157" bgcolor=#fefefe
| 1 ||  || MBA-I || 19.0 || data-sort-value="0.47" | 470 m || multiple || 2001–2016 || 03 Nov 2016 || 30 || align=left | Disc.: Spacewatch || 
|- id="2001 RW157" bgcolor=#fefefe
| 0 ||  || MBA-I || 18.6 || data-sort-value="0.57" | 570 m || multiple || 2001–2020 || 23 Oct 2020 || 41 || align=left | Disc.: Kitt Peak Obs. || 
|- id="2001 RX157" bgcolor=#E9E9E9
| 0 ||  || MBA-M || 17.7 || 1.6 km || multiple || 2001–2020 || 23 Oct 2020 || 28 || align=left | Disc.: Spacewatch || 
|- id="2001 RY157" bgcolor=#d6d6d6
| 0 ||  || MBA-O || 16.4 || 2.9 km || multiple || 1995–2021 || 09 Jan 2021 || 67 || align=left | Disc.: Spacewatch || 
|- id="2001 RZ157" bgcolor=#fefefe
| 0 ||  || MBA-I || 18.7 || data-sort-value="0.54" | 540 m || multiple || 2001–2016 || 26 Nov 2016 || 22 || align=left | Disc.: Kitt Peak Obs. || 
|- id="2001 RA158" bgcolor=#E9E9E9
| 0 ||  || MBA-M || 17.44 || 1.4 km || multiple || 2001–2021 || 12 May 2021 || 101 || align=left | Disc.: Kitt Peak Obs. || 
|- id="2001 RB158" bgcolor=#d6d6d6
| 0 ||  || MBA-O || 16.8 || 2.4 km || multiple || 2001–2020 || 16 Mar 2020 || 62 || align=left | Disc.: Kitt Peak Obs. || 
|- id="2001 RC158" bgcolor=#E9E9E9
| 0 ||  || MBA-M || 17.7 || data-sort-value="0.86" | 860 m || multiple || 2001–2020 || 13 May 2020 || 43 || align=left | Disc.: Kitt Peak Obs. || 
|- id="2001 RD158" bgcolor=#fefefe
| 0 ||  || MBA-I || 18.89 || data-sort-value="0.50" | 500 m || multiple || 2001–2021 || 30 Nov 2021 || 89 || align=left | Disc.: Kitt Peak Obs.Alt.: 2013 HL100 || 
|- id="2001 RE158" bgcolor=#fefefe
| 2 ||  || MBA-I || 18.7 || data-sort-value="0.54" | 540 m || multiple || 2001–2018 || 03 Jun 2018 || 22 || align=left | Disc.: Kitt Peak Obs. || 
|- id="2001 RF158" bgcolor=#fefefe
| 0 ||  || MBA-I || 18.5 || data-sort-value="0.59" | 590 m || multiple || 2001–2020 || 14 Sep 2020 || 46 || align=left | Disc.: Kitt Peak Obs.Added on 19 October 2020 || 
|- id="2001 RG158" bgcolor=#E9E9E9
| 0 ||  || MBA-M || 18.6 || data-sort-value="0.57" | 570 m || multiple || 2001–2018 || 17 Nov 2018 || 33 || align=left | Disc.: SpacewatchAdded on 19 October 2020 || 
|- id="2001 RH158" bgcolor=#E9E9E9
| 2 ||  || MBA-M || 18.5 || 1.1 km || multiple || 2001–2019 || 30 Jun 2019 || 23 || align=left | Disc.: SpacewatchAdded on 19 October 2020 || 
|- id="2001 RJ158" bgcolor=#fefefe
| 1 ||  || MBA-I || 18.5 || data-sort-value="0.59" | 590 m || multiple || 2001–2020 || 14 Sep 2020 || 32 || align=left | Disc.: Kitt Peak Obs.Added on 19 October 2020 || 
|- id="2001 RK158" bgcolor=#d6d6d6
| 0 ||  || MBA-O || 16.89 || 2.3 km || multiple || 2001–2021 || 15 Apr 2021 || 65 || align=left | Disc.: Spacewatch Added on 17 January 2021 || 
|- id="2001 RL158" bgcolor=#d6d6d6
| 0 ||  || MBA-O || 16.9 || 2.3 km || multiple || 1999–2021 || 15 Mar 2021 || 43 || align=left | Disc.: Kitt Peak Obs.Added on 11 May 2021 || 
|- id="2001 RN158" bgcolor=#d6d6d6
| 0 ||  || MBA-O || 16.95 || 2.3 km || multiple || 2001–2021 || 21 Apr 2021 || 28 || align=left | Disc.: SpacewatchAdded on 17 June 2021 || 
|- id="2001 RQ158" bgcolor=#fefefe
| 4 ||  || MBA-I || 18.8 || data-sort-value="0.52" | 520 m || multiple || 2001–2012 || 20 Oct 2012 || 16 || align=left | Disc.: Kitt Peak Obs.Added on 5 November 2021 || 
|}
back to top

References 
 

Lists of unnumbered minor planets